

618001–618100 

|-bgcolor=#E9E9E9
| 618001 ||  || — || June 13, 2005 || Kitt Peak || Spacewatch ||  || align=right | 1.6 km || 
|-id=002 bgcolor=#d6d6d6
| 618002 ||  || — || September 28, 2006 || Kitt Peak || Spacewatch ||  || align=right | 2.5 km || 
|-id=003 bgcolor=#d6d6d6
| 618003 ||  || — || September 28, 2006 || Kitt Peak || Spacewatch ||  || align=right | 2.6 km || 
|-id=004 bgcolor=#fefefe
| 618004 ||  || — || September 20, 2006 || Kitt Peak || Spacewatch ||  || align=right data-sort-value="0.60" | 600 m || 
|-id=005 bgcolor=#E9E9E9
| 618005 ||  || — || September 30, 2006 || Mount Lemmon || Mount Lemmon Survey ||  || align=right | 1.1 km || 
|-id=006 bgcolor=#E9E9E9
| 618006 ||  || — || September 26, 2006 || Moletai || K. Černis, J. Zdanavičius ||  || align=right | 1.5 km || 
|-id=007 bgcolor=#E9E9E9
| 618007 ||  || — || September 12, 2006 || Apache Point || SDSS Collaboration ||  || align=right | 1.1 km || 
|-id=008 bgcolor=#d6d6d6
| 618008 ||  || — || September 16, 2006 || Apache Point || SDSS Collaboration ||  || align=right | 2.8 km || 
|-id=009 bgcolor=#d6d6d6
| 618009 ||  || — || August 28, 2006 || Apache Point || SDSS Collaboration ||  || align=right | 2.7 km || 
|-id=010 bgcolor=#E9E9E9
| 618010 ||  || — || September 22, 2006 || Apache Point || SDSS Collaboration ||  || align=right | 1.3 km || 
|-id=011 bgcolor=#d6d6d6
| 618011 ||  || — || September 11, 2006 || Apache Point || SDSS Collaboration ||  || align=right | 2.8 km || 
|-id=012 bgcolor=#E9E9E9
| 618012 ||  || — || September 29, 2006 || Apache Point || SDSS Collaboration ||  || align=right | 1.2 km || 
|-id=013 bgcolor=#fefefe
| 618013 ||  || — || September 16, 2006 || Catalina || CSS ||  || align=right data-sort-value="0.75" | 750 m || 
|-id=014 bgcolor=#E9E9E9
| 618014 ||  || — || September 25, 2006 || Catalina || CSS ||  || align=right | 1.7 km || 
|-id=015 bgcolor=#FA8072
| 618015 ||  || — || September 27, 2006 || Mount Lemmon || Mount Lemmon Survey ||  || align=right data-sort-value="0.58" | 580 m || 
|-id=016 bgcolor=#E9E9E9
| 618016 ||  || — || September 17, 2006 || Kitt Peak || Spacewatch ||  || align=right data-sort-value="0.93" | 930 m || 
|-id=017 bgcolor=#E9E9E9
| 618017 ||  || — || September 30, 2006 || Catalina || CSS ||  || align=right | 1.3 km || 
|-id=018 bgcolor=#E9E9E9
| 618018 ||  || — || September 26, 2006 || Mount Lemmon || Mount Lemmon Survey ||  || align=right | 1.1 km || 
|-id=019 bgcolor=#E9E9E9
| 618019 ||  || — || May 4, 2009 || Mount Lemmon || Mount Lemmon Survey ||  || align=right | 1.1 km || 
|-id=020 bgcolor=#d6d6d6
| 618020 ||  || — || December 13, 2013 || Mount Lemmon || Mount Lemmon Survey ||  || align=right | 2.9 km || 
|-id=021 bgcolor=#d6d6d6
| 618021 ||  || — || September 30, 2006 || Mount Lemmon || Mount Lemmon Survey ||  || align=right | 2.4 km || 
|-id=022 bgcolor=#d6d6d6
| 618022 ||  || — || February 20, 2009 || Kitt Peak || Spacewatch ||  || align=right | 2.3 km || 
|-id=023 bgcolor=#E9E9E9
| 618023 ||  || — || September 18, 2006 || Vail-Jarnac || Jarnac Obs. ||  || align=right data-sort-value="0.70" | 700 m || 
|-id=024 bgcolor=#E9E9E9
| 618024 ||  || — || September 29, 2006 || Anderson Mesa || LONEOS ||  || align=right | 1.5 km || 
|-id=025 bgcolor=#E9E9E9
| 618025 ||  || — || February 8, 2008 || Mount Lemmon || Mount Lemmon Survey ||  || align=right | 1.3 km || 
|-id=026 bgcolor=#E9E9E9
| 618026 ||  || — || October 9, 2015 || Haleakala || Pan-STARRS ||  || align=right | 1.2 km || 
|-id=027 bgcolor=#fefefe
| 618027 ||  || — || August 18, 2006 || Kitt Peak || Spacewatch ||  || align=right data-sort-value="0.62" | 620 m || 
|-id=028 bgcolor=#E9E9E9
| 618028 ||  || — || September 18, 2006 || Anderson Mesa || LONEOS ||  || align=right | 1.3 km || 
|-id=029 bgcolor=#E9E9E9
| 618029 ||  || — || September 15, 2006 || Kitt Peak || Spacewatch ||  || align=right | 1.0 km || 
|-id=030 bgcolor=#E9E9E9
| 618030 ||  || — || September 12, 2015 || Haleakala || Pan-STARRS ||  || align=right | 1.2 km || 
|-id=031 bgcolor=#d6d6d6
| 618031 ||  || — || September 16, 2006 || Catalina || CSS ||  || align=right | 1.9 km || 
|-id=032 bgcolor=#E9E9E9
| 618032 ||  || — || September 17, 2006 || Kitt Peak || Spacewatch ||  || align=right data-sort-value="0.70" | 700 m || 
|-id=033 bgcolor=#E9E9E9
| 618033 ||  || — || September 16, 2006 || Catalina || CSS ||  || align=right data-sort-value="0.74" | 740 m || 
|-id=034 bgcolor=#E9E9E9
| 618034 ||  || — || September 30, 2006 || Mount Lemmon || Mount Lemmon Survey ||  || align=right | 1.1 km || 
|-id=035 bgcolor=#E9E9E9
| 618035 ||  || — || September 28, 2006 || Catalina || CSS ||  || align=right data-sort-value="0.80" | 800 m || 
|-id=036 bgcolor=#E9E9E9
| 618036 ||  || — || September 28, 2006 || Catalina || CSS ||  || align=right | 1.4 km || 
|-id=037 bgcolor=#E9E9E9
| 618037 ||  || — || October 13, 2006 || Kitt Peak || Spacewatch ||  || align=right data-sort-value="0.63" | 630 m || 
|-id=038 bgcolor=#E9E9E9
| 618038 ||  || — || October 13, 2006 || Kitt Peak || Spacewatch ||  || align=right data-sort-value="0.72" | 720 m || 
|-id=039 bgcolor=#E9E9E9
| 618039 ||  || — || October 2, 2006 || Mount Lemmon || Mount Lemmon Survey ||  || align=right data-sort-value="0.55" | 550 m || 
|-id=040 bgcolor=#fefefe
| 618040 ||  || — || October 15, 2006 || Catalina || CSS ||  || align=right data-sort-value="0.53" | 530 m || 
|-id=041 bgcolor=#d6d6d6
| 618041 ||  || — || September 29, 2006 || Apache Point || SDSS Collaboration ||  || align=right | 2.0 km || 
|-id=042 bgcolor=#E9E9E9
| 618042 ||  || — || October 3, 2006 || Apache Point || SDSS Collaboration ||  || align=right | 1.3 km || 
|-id=043 bgcolor=#E9E9E9
| 618043 ||  || — || October 2, 2006 || Mount Lemmon || Mount Lemmon Survey ||  || align=right | 1.1 km || 
|-id=044 bgcolor=#fefefe
| 618044 ||  || — || October 2, 2006 || Mount Lemmon || Mount Lemmon Survey ||  || align=right data-sort-value="0.60" | 600 m || 
|-id=045 bgcolor=#fefefe
| 618045 ||  || — || October 2, 2006 || Mount Lemmon || Mount Lemmon Survey ||  || align=right data-sort-value="0.63" | 630 m || 
|-id=046 bgcolor=#d6d6d6
| 618046 ||  || — || October 12, 2006 || Palomar || NEAT ||  || align=right | 2.6 km || 
|-id=047 bgcolor=#fefefe
| 618047 ||  || — || March 26, 2008 || Mount Lemmon || Mount Lemmon Survey ||  || align=right data-sort-value="0.50" | 500 m || 
|-id=048 bgcolor=#E9E9E9
| 618048 ||  || — || October 4, 2006 || Mount Lemmon || Mount Lemmon Survey ||  || align=right | 1.8 km || 
|-id=049 bgcolor=#E9E9E9
| 618049 ||  || — || April 11, 2013 || Mount Lemmon || Mount Lemmon Survey ||  || align=right | 1.2 km || 
|-id=050 bgcolor=#E9E9E9
| 618050 ||  || — || October 3, 2006 || Mount Lemmon || Mount Lemmon Survey ||  || align=right | 1.2 km || 
|-id=051 bgcolor=#fefefe
| 618051 ||  || — || December 16, 2003 || Mauna Kea || Mauna Kea Obs. ||  || align=right data-sort-value="0.51" | 510 m || 
|-id=052 bgcolor=#E9E9E9
| 618052 ||  || — || October 3, 2006 || Mount Lemmon || Mount Lemmon Survey ||  || align=right | 1.1 km || 
|-id=053 bgcolor=#E9E9E9
| 618053 ||  || — || October 17, 2006 || Mount Lemmon || Mount Lemmon Survey ||  || align=right | 1.3 km || 
|-id=054 bgcolor=#E9E9E9
| 618054 ||  || — || October 16, 2006 || Kitt Peak || Spacewatch ||  || align=right data-sort-value="0.88" | 880 m || 
|-id=055 bgcolor=#d6d6d6
| 618055 ||  || — || October 17, 2006 || Kitt Peak || Spacewatch ||  || align=right | 2.9 km || 
|-id=056 bgcolor=#E9E9E9
| 618056 ||  || — || October 16, 2006 || Catalina || CSS ||  || align=right | 1.4 km || 
|-id=057 bgcolor=#E9E9E9
| 618057 ||  || — || September 27, 2006 || Mount Lemmon || Mount Lemmon Survey ||  || align=right | 1.6 km || 
|-id=058 bgcolor=#E9E9E9
| 618058 ||  || — || October 18, 2006 || Kitt Peak || Spacewatch ||  || align=right | 1.0 km || 
|-id=059 bgcolor=#d6d6d6
| 618059 ||  || — || September 15, 2006 || Kitt Peak || Spacewatch ||  || align=right | 2.6 km || 
|-id=060 bgcolor=#E9E9E9
| 618060 ||  || — || October 18, 2006 || Kitt Peak || Spacewatch ||  || align=right | 1.1 km || 
|-id=061 bgcolor=#E9E9E9
| 618061 ||  || — || September 26, 2006 || Kitt Peak || Spacewatch ||  || align=right data-sort-value="0.73" | 730 m || 
|-id=062 bgcolor=#fefefe
| 618062 ||  || — || October 19, 2006 || Kitt Peak || Spacewatch ||  || align=right data-sort-value="0.46" | 460 m || 
|-id=063 bgcolor=#E9E9E9
| 618063 ||  || — || October 19, 2006 || Kitt Peak || Spacewatch ||  || align=right | 1.9 km || 
|-id=064 bgcolor=#fefefe
| 618064 ||  || — || May 14, 2005 || Mount Lemmon || Mount Lemmon Survey ||  || align=right data-sort-value="0.76" | 760 m || 
|-id=065 bgcolor=#E9E9E9
| 618065 ||  || — || September 30, 2006 || Mount Lemmon || Mount Lemmon Survey ||  || align=right | 1.1 km || 
|-id=066 bgcolor=#fefefe
| 618066 ||  || — || October 21, 2006 || Mount Lemmon || Mount Lemmon Survey ||  || align=right data-sort-value="0.47" | 470 m || 
|-id=067 bgcolor=#d6d6d6
| 618067 ||  || — || September 19, 2006 || Kitt Peak || Spacewatch ||  || align=right | 2.6 km || 
|-id=068 bgcolor=#E9E9E9
| 618068 ||  || — || September 24, 2006 || Kitt Peak || Spacewatch ||  || align=right | 1.0 km || 
|-id=069 bgcolor=#E9E9E9
| 618069 ||  || — || October 4, 2006 || Mount Lemmon || Mount Lemmon Survey ||  || align=right | 1.2 km || 
|-id=070 bgcolor=#E9E9E9
| 618070 ||  || — || October 20, 2006 || Kitt Peak || Spacewatch ||  || align=right | 1.00 km || 
|-id=071 bgcolor=#fefefe
| 618071 ||  || — || September 25, 2006 || Mount Lemmon || Mount Lemmon Survey ||  || align=right data-sort-value="0.62" | 620 m || 
|-id=072 bgcolor=#E9E9E9
| 618072 ||  || — || October 17, 2006 || Kitt Peak || Spacewatch ||  || align=right | 1.4 km || 
|-id=073 bgcolor=#d6d6d6
| 618073 ||  || — || October 27, 2006 || Mount Lemmon || Mount Lemmon Survey ||  || align=right | 3.1 km || 
|-id=074 bgcolor=#E9E9E9
| 618074 ||  || — || October 19, 2006 || Kitt Peak || Spacewatch ||  || align=right | 1.1 km || 
|-id=075 bgcolor=#d6d6d6
| 618075 ||  || — || April 9, 2003 || Kitt Peak || Spacewatch ||  || align=right | 2.5 km || 
|-id=076 bgcolor=#E9E9E9
| 618076 ||  || — || October 19, 2006 || Kitt Peak || L. H. Wasserman ||  || align=right | 1.1 km || 
|-id=077 bgcolor=#d6d6d6
| 618077 ||  || — || October 16, 2006 || Kitt Peak || Spacewatch ||  || align=right | 2.5 km || 
|-id=078 bgcolor=#E9E9E9
| 618078 ||  || — || November 24, 2006 || Mount Lemmon || Mount Lemmon Survey ||  || align=right | 1.4 km || 
|-id=079 bgcolor=#fefefe
| 618079 ||  || — || October 16, 2006 || Kitt Peak || Spacewatch ||  || align=right data-sort-value="0.52" | 520 m || 
|-id=080 bgcolor=#E9E9E9
| 618080 ||  || — || October 26, 2006 || Mauna Kea || Mauna Kea Obs. ||  || align=right | 1.2 km || 
|-id=081 bgcolor=#fefefe
| 618081 ||  || — || October 17, 2006 || Mount Lemmon || Mount Lemmon Survey ||  || align=right data-sort-value="0.67" | 670 m || 
|-id=082 bgcolor=#E9E9E9
| 618082 ||  || — || October 19, 2006 || Mount Lemmon || Mount Lemmon Survey ||  || align=right | 1.0 km || 
|-id=083 bgcolor=#E9E9E9
| 618083 ||  || — || October 21, 2006 || Mount Lemmon || Mount Lemmon Survey ||  || align=right data-sort-value="0.70" | 700 m || 
|-id=084 bgcolor=#fefefe
| 618084 ||  || — || October 21, 2006 || Mount Lemmon || Mount Lemmon Survey ||  || align=right data-sort-value="0.62" | 620 m || 
|-id=085 bgcolor=#fefefe
| 618085 ||  || — || October 16, 2006 || Kitt Peak || Spacewatch ||  || align=right data-sort-value="0.55" | 550 m || 
|-id=086 bgcolor=#fefefe
| 618086 ||  || — || September 19, 2017 || Haleakala || Pan-STARRS || H || align=right data-sort-value="0.45" | 450 m || 
|-id=087 bgcolor=#E9E9E9
| 618087 ||  || — || January 11, 2008 || Mount Lemmon || Mount Lemmon Survey ||  || align=right | 1.3 km || 
|-id=088 bgcolor=#E9E9E9
| 618088 ||  || — || October 27, 2006 || Kitt Peak || Spacewatch ||  || align=right | 1.9 km || 
|-id=089 bgcolor=#d6d6d6
| 618089 ||  || — || October 12, 2006 || Kitt Peak || Spacewatch ||  || align=right | 2.4 km || 
|-id=090 bgcolor=#d6d6d6
| 618090 ||  || — || October 11, 2006 || Mauna Kea || Mauna Kea Obs. ||  || align=right | 2.3 km || 
|-id=091 bgcolor=#E9E9E9
| 618091 ||  || — || October 22, 2006 || Kitt Peak || Spacewatch ||  || align=right | 1.2 km || 
|-id=092 bgcolor=#E9E9E9
| 618092 ||  || — || October 22, 2006 || Kitt Peak || Spacewatch ||  || align=right data-sort-value="0.72" | 720 m || 
|-id=093 bgcolor=#E9E9E9
| 618093 ||  || — || October 16, 2006 || Catalina || CSS ||  || align=right | 1.3 km || 
|-id=094 bgcolor=#d6d6d6
| 618094 ||  || — || May 21, 2015 || Haleakala || Pan-STARRS ||  || align=right | 2.7 km || 
|-id=095 bgcolor=#fefefe
| 618095 ||  || — || October 23, 2006 || Kitt Peak || Spacewatch ||  || align=right data-sort-value="0.44" | 440 m || 
|-id=096 bgcolor=#d6d6d6
| 618096 ||  || — || October 21, 2006 || Mount Lemmon || Mount Lemmon Survey ||  || align=right | 1.8 km || 
|-id=097 bgcolor=#E9E9E9
| 618097 ||  || — || November 10, 2006 || Kitt Peak || Spacewatch ||  || align=right | 1.7 km || 
|-id=098 bgcolor=#fefefe
| 618098 ||  || — || November 11, 2006 || Kitt Peak || Spacewatch ||  || align=right data-sort-value="0.50" | 500 m || 
|-id=099 bgcolor=#d6d6d6
| 618099 ||  || — || July 31, 2005 || Palomar || NEAT ||  || align=right | 3.1 km || 
|-id=100 bgcolor=#fefefe
| 618100 ||  || — || November 11, 2006 || Kitt Peak || Spacewatch || H || align=right data-sort-value="0.64" | 640 m || 
|}

618101–618200 

|-bgcolor=#fefefe
| 618101 ||  || — || November 12, 2006 || Mount Lemmon || Mount Lemmon Survey ||  || align=right data-sort-value="0.57" | 570 m || 
|-id=102 bgcolor=#fefefe
| 618102 ||  || — || October 4, 2006 || Mount Lemmon || Mount Lemmon Survey ||  || align=right data-sort-value="0.70" | 700 m || 
|-id=103 bgcolor=#E9E9E9
| 618103 ||  || — || November 14, 2006 || Kitt Peak || Spacewatch ||  || align=right | 1.7 km || 
|-id=104 bgcolor=#E9E9E9
| 618104 ||  || — || November 15, 2006 || Kitt Peak || Spacewatch ||  || align=right | 1.6 km || 
|-id=105 bgcolor=#E9E9E9
| 618105 ||  || — || November 15, 2006 || Catalina || CSS ||  || align=right | 1.4 km || 
|-id=106 bgcolor=#d6d6d6
| 618106 ||  || — || November 1, 2006 || Mount Lemmon || Mount Lemmon Survey ||  || align=right | 2.5 km || 
|-id=107 bgcolor=#E9E9E9
| 618107 ||  || — || November 15, 2006 || Kitt Peak || Spacewatch ||  || align=right data-sort-value="0.68" | 680 m || 
|-id=108 bgcolor=#E9E9E9
| 618108 ||  || — || November 11, 2006 || Kitt Peak || Spacewatch ||  || align=right | 1.2 km || 
|-id=109 bgcolor=#E9E9E9
| 618109 ||  || — || March 15, 2013 || Mount Lemmon || Mount Lemmon Survey ||  || align=right data-sort-value="0.88" | 880 m || 
|-id=110 bgcolor=#E9E9E9
| 618110 ||  || — || November 2, 2006 || Bergisch Gladbach || W. Bickel ||  || align=right | 1.5 km || 
|-id=111 bgcolor=#d6d6d6
| 618111 ||  || — || November 12, 2006 || Mount Lemmon || Mount Lemmon Survey ||  || align=right | 2.6 km || 
|-id=112 bgcolor=#fefefe
| 618112 ||  || — || November 16, 2006 || Mount Lemmon || Mount Lemmon Survey ||  || align=right data-sort-value="0.56" | 560 m || 
|-id=113 bgcolor=#d6d6d6
| 618113 ||  || — || November 16, 2006 || Kitt Peak || Spacewatch ||  || align=right | 2.4 km || 
|-id=114 bgcolor=#E9E9E9
| 618114 ||  || — || November 17, 2006 || Mount Lemmon || Mount Lemmon Survey ||  || align=right | 1.8 km || 
|-id=115 bgcolor=#d6d6d6
| 618115 ||  || — || October 2, 2006 || Mount Lemmon || Mount Lemmon Survey ||  || align=right | 2.6 km || 
|-id=116 bgcolor=#E9E9E9
| 618116 ||  || — || November 17, 2006 || Mount Lemmon || Mount Lemmon Survey ||  || align=right | 1.8 km || 
|-id=117 bgcolor=#E9E9E9
| 618117 ||  || — || November 17, 2006 || Mount Lemmon || Mount Lemmon Survey ||  || align=right | 1.7 km || 
|-id=118 bgcolor=#E9E9E9
| 618118 ||  || — || October 21, 2006 || Mount Lemmon || Mount Lemmon Survey ||  || align=right | 1.8 km || 
|-id=119 bgcolor=#E9E9E9
| 618119 ||  || — || October 23, 2006 || Mount Lemmon || Mount Lemmon Survey ||  || align=right | 1.3 km || 
|-id=120 bgcolor=#E9E9E9
| 618120 ||  || — || November 16, 2006 || Kitt Peak || Spacewatch ||  || align=right | 1.3 km || 
|-id=121 bgcolor=#E9E9E9
| 618121 ||  || — || November 16, 2006 || Kitt Peak || Spacewatch ||  || align=right | 1.4 km || 
|-id=122 bgcolor=#E9E9E9
| 618122 ||  || — || November 16, 2006 || Kitt Peak || Spacewatch ||  || align=right | 1.4 km || 
|-id=123 bgcolor=#fefefe
| 618123 ||  || — || November 17, 2006 || Mount Lemmon || Mount Lemmon Survey ||  || align=right data-sort-value="0.65" | 650 m || 
|-id=124 bgcolor=#d6d6d6
| 618124 ||  || — || November 17, 2006 || Mount Lemmon || Mount Lemmon Survey ||  || align=right | 3.1 km || 
|-id=125 bgcolor=#E9E9E9
| 618125 ||  || — || November 18, 2006 || Kitt Peak || Spacewatch ||  || align=right | 1.3 km || 
|-id=126 bgcolor=#E9E9E9
| 618126 ||  || — || February 21, 2017 || Haleakala || Pan-STARRS ||  || align=right | 1.6 km || 
|-id=127 bgcolor=#E9E9E9
| 618127 ||  || — || November 19, 2006 || Kitt Peak || Spacewatch ||  || align=right data-sort-value="0.72" | 720 m || 
|-id=128 bgcolor=#fefefe
| 618128 ||  || — || September 30, 2006 || Mount Lemmon || Mount Lemmon Survey ||  || align=right data-sort-value="0.59" | 590 m || 
|-id=129 bgcolor=#E9E9E9
| 618129 ||  || — || November 19, 2006 || Kitt Peak || Spacewatch ||  || align=right | 1.5 km || 
|-id=130 bgcolor=#E9E9E9
| 618130 ||  || — || November 20, 2006 || Kitt Peak || Spacewatch ||  || align=right | 1.2 km || 
|-id=131 bgcolor=#E9E9E9
| 618131 ||  || — || November 20, 2006 || Mount Lemmon || Mount Lemmon Survey ||  || align=right | 1.1 km || 
|-id=132 bgcolor=#E9E9E9
| 618132 ||  || — || November 27, 2006 || Uccle || P. De Cat ||  || align=right | 2.2 km || 
|-id=133 bgcolor=#d6d6d6
| 618133 ||  || — || October 13, 2006 || Kitt Peak || Spacewatch ||  || align=right | 1.2 km || 
|-id=134 bgcolor=#E9E9E9
| 618134 ||  || — || November 19, 2006 || Kitt Peak || Spacewatch ||  || align=right | 1.0 km || 
|-id=135 bgcolor=#fefefe
| 618135 ||  || — || October 23, 2006 || Mount Lemmon || Mount Lemmon Survey ||  || align=right data-sort-value="0.66" | 660 m || 
|-id=136 bgcolor=#E9E9E9
| 618136 ||  || — || November 20, 2006 || Kitt Peak || Spacewatch ||  || align=right data-sort-value="0.77" | 770 m || 
|-id=137 bgcolor=#E9E9E9
| 618137 ||  || — || November 22, 2006 || Catalina || CSS ||  || align=right | 1.8 km || 
|-id=138 bgcolor=#fefefe
| 618138 ||  || — || November 23, 2006 || Kitt Peak || Spacewatch ||  || align=right data-sort-value="0.61" | 610 m || 
|-id=139 bgcolor=#E9E9E9
| 618139 ||  || — || April 17, 2013 || Haleakala || Pan-STARRS ||  || align=right | 1.1 km || 
|-id=140 bgcolor=#E9E9E9
| 618140 ||  || — || November 24, 2006 || Kitt Peak || Spacewatch ||  || align=right data-sort-value="0.85" | 850 m || 
|-id=141 bgcolor=#E9E9E9
| 618141 ||  || — || November 22, 2006 || Kitt Peak || Spacewatch ||  || align=right | 1.4 km || 
|-id=142 bgcolor=#fefefe
| 618142 ||  || — || November 17, 2006 || Mount Lemmon || Mount Lemmon Survey ||  || align=right data-sort-value="0.70" | 700 m || 
|-id=143 bgcolor=#fefefe
| 618143 ||  || — || April 1, 2008 || Kitt Peak || Spacewatch ||  || align=right data-sort-value="0.69" | 690 m || 
|-id=144 bgcolor=#E9E9E9
| 618144 ||  || — || December 27, 2011 || Mount Lemmon || Mount Lemmon Survey ||  || align=right | 1.4 km || 
|-id=145 bgcolor=#fefefe
| 618145 ||  || — || May 20, 2015 || Mount Lemmon || Mount Lemmon Survey ||  || align=right data-sort-value="0.68" | 680 m || 
|-id=146 bgcolor=#fefefe
| 618146 ||  || — || December 11, 2013 || Haleakala || Pan-STARRS ||  || align=right data-sort-value="0.66" | 660 m || 
|-id=147 bgcolor=#fefefe
| 618147 ||  || — || October 7, 2016 || Haleakala || Pan-STARRS ||  || align=right data-sort-value="0.51" | 510 m || 
|-id=148 bgcolor=#E9E9E9
| 618148 ||  || — || November 24, 2006 || Mount Lemmon || Mount Lemmon Survey ||  || align=right | 1.3 km || 
|-id=149 bgcolor=#E9E9E9
| 618149 ||  || — || January 19, 2012 || Mount Lemmon || Mount Lemmon Survey ||  || align=right | 1.4 km || 
|-id=150 bgcolor=#fefefe
| 618150 ||  || — || January 26, 2011 || Kitt Peak || Spacewatch ||  || align=right data-sort-value="0.60" | 600 m || 
|-id=151 bgcolor=#fefefe
| 618151 ||  || — || November 16, 2006 || Kitt Peak || Spacewatch ||  || align=right data-sort-value="0.54" | 540 m || 
|-id=152 bgcolor=#fefefe
| 618152 ||  || — || November 16, 2006 || Kitt Peak || Spacewatch ||  || align=right data-sort-value="0.45" | 450 m || 
|-id=153 bgcolor=#FA8072
| 618153 ||  || — || November 21, 2006 || Catalina || CSS ||  || align=right data-sort-value="0.69" | 690 m || 
|-id=154 bgcolor=#E9E9E9
| 618154 ||  || — || December 13, 2006 || Mount Lemmon || Mount Lemmon Survey ||  || align=right | 1.9 km || 
|-id=155 bgcolor=#E9E9E9
| 618155 ||  || — || December 14, 2006 || Kitt Peak || Spacewatch ||  || align=right | 1.3 km || 
|-id=156 bgcolor=#E9E9E9
| 618156 ||  || — || December 15, 2006 || Kitt Peak || Spacewatch ||  || align=right | 1.6 km || 
|-id=157 bgcolor=#fefefe
| 618157 ||  || — || December 15, 2006 || Kitt Peak || Spacewatch ||  || align=right data-sort-value="0.68" | 680 m || 
|-id=158 bgcolor=#E9E9E9
| 618158 ||  || — || October 31, 2010 || Mount Lemmon || Mount Lemmon Survey ||  || align=right | 1.8 km || 
|-id=159 bgcolor=#fefefe
| 618159 ||  || — || May 12, 2016 || Haleakala || Pan-STARRS || H || align=right data-sort-value="0.47" | 470 m || 
|-id=160 bgcolor=#fefefe
| 618160 ||  || — || December 1, 2006 || Mount Lemmon || Mount Lemmon Survey ||  || align=right data-sort-value="0.46" | 460 m || 
|-id=161 bgcolor=#E9E9E9
| 618161 ||  || — || December 16, 2006 || Mount Lemmon || Mount Lemmon Survey ||  || align=right | 1.6 km || 
|-id=162 bgcolor=#fefefe
| 618162 ||  || — || December 22, 2006 || Bergisch Gladbach || W. Bickel ||  || align=right data-sort-value="0.81" | 810 m || 
|-id=163 bgcolor=#E9E9E9
| 618163 ||  || — || March 13, 2003 || Kitt Peak || Spacewatch ||  || align=right | 1.5 km || 
|-id=164 bgcolor=#fefefe
| 618164 ||  || — || December 21, 2006 || Kitt Peak || Spacewatch ||  || align=right data-sort-value="0.57" | 570 m || 
|-id=165 bgcolor=#E9E9E9
| 618165 ||  || — || December 21, 2006 || Kitt Peak || Spacewatch ||  || align=right | 1.8 km || 
|-id=166 bgcolor=#fefefe
| 618166 ||  || — || December 21, 2006 || Kitt Peak || Spacewatch ||  || align=right data-sort-value="0.70" | 700 m || 
|-id=167 bgcolor=#E9E9E9
| 618167 ||  || — || December 15, 2006 || Kitt Peak || Spacewatch ||  || align=right | 1.9 km || 
|-id=168 bgcolor=#d6d6d6
| 618168 ||  || — || October 2, 2011 || Piszkesteto || K. Sárneczky ||  || align=right | 3.0 km || 
|-id=169 bgcolor=#fefefe
| 618169 ||  || — || December 24, 2006 || Kitt Peak || Spacewatch ||  || align=right data-sort-value="0.62" | 620 m || 
|-id=170 bgcolor=#E9E9E9
| 618170 ||  || — || October 14, 2010 || Mount Lemmon || Mount Lemmon Survey ||  || align=right | 1.5 km || 
|-id=171 bgcolor=#fefefe
| 618171 ||  || — || January 9, 2007 || Kitt Peak || Spacewatch || H || align=right data-sort-value="0.72" | 720 m || 
|-id=172 bgcolor=#fefefe
| 618172 ||  || — || January 10, 2007 || Mount Lemmon || Mount Lemmon Survey ||  || align=right data-sort-value="0.52" | 520 m || 
|-id=173 bgcolor=#E9E9E9
| 618173 ||  || — || January 10, 2007 || Mount Lemmon || Mount Lemmon Survey ||  || align=right | 1.3 km || 
|-id=174 bgcolor=#fefefe
| 618174 ||  || — || January 16, 2007 || Catalina || CSS ||  || align=right data-sort-value="0.72" | 720 m || 
|-id=175 bgcolor=#fefefe
| 618175 ||  || — || January 17, 2007 || Kitt Peak || Spacewatch ||  || align=right data-sort-value="0.70" | 700 m || 
|-id=176 bgcolor=#E9E9E9
| 618176 ||  || — || January 8, 2007 || Mount Lemmon || Mount Lemmon Survey ||  || align=right | 1.0 km || 
|-id=177 bgcolor=#E9E9E9
| 618177 ||  || — || January 24, 2007 || Mount Lemmon || Mount Lemmon Survey ||  || align=right | 2.0 km || 
|-id=178 bgcolor=#E9E9E9
| 618178 ||  || — || January 27, 2007 || Mount Lemmon || Mount Lemmon Survey ||  || align=right | 2.6 km || 
|-id=179 bgcolor=#E9E9E9
| 618179 ||  || — || January 24, 2007 || Kitt Peak || Spacewatch ||  || align=right | 1.9 km || 
|-id=180 bgcolor=#E9E9E9
| 618180 ||  || — || January 24, 2007 || Kitt Peak || Spacewatch ||  || align=right | 1.7 km || 
|-id=181 bgcolor=#fefefe
| 618181 ||  || — || January 17, 2007 || Kitt Peak || Spacewatch ||  || align=right data-sort-value="0.67" | 670 m || 
|-id=182 bgcolor=#E9E9E9
| 618182 ||  || — || December 27, 2006 || Mount Lemmon || Mount Lemmon Survey ||  || align=right data-sort-value="0.71" | 710 m || 
|-id=183 bgcolor=#fefefe
| 618183 ||  || — || January 25, 2007 || Kitt Peak || Spacewatch ||  || align=right data-sort-value="0.55" | 550 m || 
|-id=184 bgcolor=#E9E9E9
| 618184 ||  || — || January 17, 2007 || Kitt Peak || Spacewatch ||  || align=right | 1.8 km || 
|-id=185 bgcolor=#E9E9E9
| 618185 ||  || — || January 19, 2007 || Mauna Kea || Mauna Kea Obs. ||  || align=right | 1.7 km || 
|-id=186 bgcolor=#E9E9E9
| 618186 ||  || — || January 19, 2007 || Mauna Kea || Mauna Kea Obs. ||  || align=right | 1.4 km || 
|-id=187 bgcolor=#fefefe
| 618187 ||  || — || January 19, 2007 || Mauna Kea || Mauna Kea Obs. ||  || align=right data-sort-value="0.64" | 640 m || 
|-id=188 bgcolor=#E9E9E9
| 618188 ||  || — || January 24, 2007 || Mount Lemmon || Mount Lemmon Survey ||  || align=right | 1.3 km || 
|-id=189 bgcolor=#fefefe
| 618189 ||  || — || January 28, 2007 || Mount Lemmon || Mount Lemmon Survey ||  || align=right data-sort-value="0.58" | 580 m || 
|-id=190 bgcolor=#E9E9E9
| 618190 ||  || — || January 29, 2007 || Kitt Peak || Spacewatch ||  || align=right data-sort-value="0.81" | 810 m || 
|-id=191 bgcolor=#fefefe
| 618191 ||  || — || January 10, 2007 || Kitt Peak || Spacewatch ||  || align=right data-sort-value="0.54" | 540 m || 
|-id=192 bgcolor=#E9E9E9
| 618192 ||  || — || December 10, 2015 || Mount Lemmon || Mount Lemmon Survey ||  || align=right | 2.0 km || 
|-id=193 bgcolor=#fefefe
| 618193 ||  || — || January 10, 2007 || Kitt Peak || Spacewatch ||  || align=right data-sort-value="0.54" | 540 m || 
|-id=194 bgcolor=#fefefe
| 618194 ||  || — || March 14, 2011 || Mount Lemmon || Mount Lemmon Survey ||  || align=right data-sort-value="0.79" | 790 m || 
|-id=195 bgcolor=#fefefe
| 618195 ||  || — || January 29, 2007 || Kitt Peak || Spacewatch ||  || align=right data-sort-value="0.62" | 620 m || 
|-id=196 bgcolor=#fefefe
| 618196 ||  || — || July 2, 2008 || Kitt Peak || Spacewatch ||  || align=right data-sort-value="0.72" | 720 m || 
|-id=197 bgcolor=#d6d6d6
| 618197 ||  || — || January 25, 2007 || Kitt Peak || Spacewatch || 7:4 || align=right | 3.7 km || 
|-id=198 bgcolor=#E9E9E9
| 618198 ||  || — || January 27, 2007 || Mount Lemmon || Mount Lemmon Survey ||  || align=right | 1.2 km || 
|-id=199 bgcolor=#E9E9E9
| 618199 ||  || — || January 26, 2007 || Kitt Peak || Spacewatch ||  || align=right | 1.4 km || 
|-id=200 bgcolor=#E9E9E9
| 618200 ||  || — || January 27, 2007 || Kitt Peak || Spacewatch ||  || align=right | 1.6 km || 
|}

618201–618300 

|-bgcolor=#E9E9E9
| 618201 ||  || — || January 29, 2007 || Kitt Peak || Spacewatch ||  || align=right | 1.7 km || 
|-id=202 bgcolor=#fefefe
| 618202 ||  || — || November 21, 2006 || Mount Lemmon || Mount Lemmon Survey ||  || align=right | 1.4 km || 
|-id=203 bgcolor=#fefefe
| 618203 ||  || — || January 25, 2007 || Kitt Peak || Spacewatch ||  || align=right data-sort-value="0.66" | 660 m || 
|-id=204 bgcolor=#fefefe
| 618204 ||  || — || February 8, 2007 || Mount Lemmon || Mount Lemmon Survey ||  || align=right data-sort-value="0.52" | 520 m || 
|-id=205 bgcolor=#E9E9E9
| 618205 ||  || — || January 15, 2007 || Catalina || CSS ||  || align=right | 1.4 km || 
|-id=206 bgcolor=#E9E9E9
| 618206 ||  || — || January 27, 2007 || Kitt Peak || Spacewatch ||  || align=right | 1.8 km || 
|-id=207 bgcolor=#E9E9E9
| 618207 ||  || — || October 13, 2001 || Palomar || NEAT ||  || align=right | 1.7 km || 
|-id=208 bgcolor=#d6d6d6
| 618208 ||  || — || June 7, 2016 || Haleakala || Pan-STARRS || 7:4 || align=right | 2.8 km || 
|-id=209 bgcolor=#fefefe
| 618209 ||  || — || January 21, 2014 || Kitt Peak || Spacewatch ||  || align=right data-sort-value="0.68" | 680 m || 
|-id=210 bgcolor=#fefefe
| 618210 ||  || — || February 13, 2007 || Mount Lemmon || Mount Lemmon Survey ||  || align=right data-sort-value="0.67" | 670 m || 
|-id=211 bgcolor=#fefefe
| 618211 ||  || — || February 17, 2007 || Kitt Peak || Spacewatch ||  || align=right data-sort-value="0.52" | 520 m || 
|-id=212 bgcolor=#fefefe
| 618212 ||  || — || February 17, 2007 || Kitt Peak || Spacewatch ||  || align=right data-sort-value="0.77" | 770 m || 
|-id=213 bgcolor=#E9E9E9
| 618213 ||  || — || February 6, 2007 || Mount Lemmon || Mount Lemmon Survey ||  || align=right | 1.9 km || 
|-id=214 bgcolor=#fefefe
| 618214 ||  || — || February 21, 2007 || Mount Lemmon || Mount Lemmon Survey ||  || align=right data-sort-value="0.59" | 590 m || 
|-id=215 bgcolor=#E9E9E9
| 618215 ||  || — || February 21, 2007 || Kitt Peak || Spacewatch ||  || align=right | 2.0 km || 
|-id=216 bgcolor=#E9E9E9
| 618216 ||  || — || February 21, 2007 || Kitt Peak || Spacewatch ||  || align=right | 2.0 km || 
|-id=217 bgcolor=#E9E9E9
| 618217 ||  || — || February 23, 2007 || Mount Lemmon || Mount Lemmon Survey ||  || align=right | 2.2 km || 
|-id=218 bgcolor=#fefefe
| 618218 ||  || — || February 25, 2007 || Anderson Mesa || LONEOS ||  || align=right data-sort-value="0.79" | 790 m || 
|-id=219 bgcolor=#E9E9E9
| 618219 ||  || — || April 12, 2012 || Haleakala || Pan-STARRS ||  || align=right | 1.8 km || 
|-id=220 bgcolor=#E9E9E9
| 618220 ||  || — || February 25, 2007 || Kitt Peak || Spacewatch ||  || align=right | 1.8 km || 
|-id=221 bgcolor=#E9E9E9
| 618221 ||  || — || October 4, 2014 || Mount Lemmon || Mount Lemmon Survey ||  || align=right | 2.1 km || 
|-id=222 bgcolor=#d6d6d6
| 618222 ||  || — || February 17, 2007 || Kitt Peak || Spacewatch ||  || align=right | 1.7 km || 
|-id=223 bgcolor=#fefefe
| 618223 ||  || — || February 23, 2007 || Kitt Peak || Spacewatch ||  || align=right data-sort-value="0.60" | 600 m || 
|-id=224 bgcolor=#C2FFFF
| 618224 ||  || — || February 21, 2007 || Kitt Peak || Spacewatch || L5 || align=right | 6.0 km || 
|-id=225 bgcolor=#fefefe
| 618225 ||  || — || February 21, 2007 || Mount Lemmon || Mount Lemmon Survey ||  || align=right data-sort-value="0.51" | 510 m || 
|-id=226 bgcolor=#E9E9E9
| 618226 ||  || — || February 23, 2007 || Mount Lemmon || Mount Lemmon Survey ||  || align=right | 1.1 km || 
|-id=227 bgcolor=#fefefe
| 618227 ||  || — || February 25, 2007 || Mount Lemmon || Mount Lemmon Survey ||  || align=right data-sort-value="0.63" | 630 m || 
|-id=228 bgcolor=#fefefe
| 618228 ||  || — || February 23, 2007 || Mount Lemmon || Mount Lemmon Survey ||  || align=right data-sort-value="0.66" | 660 m || 
|-id=229 bgcolor=#E9E9E9
| 618229 ||  || — || February 21, 2007 || Mount Lemmon || Mount Lemmon Survey ||  || align=right | 1.9 km || 
|-id=230 bgcolor=#fefefe
| 618230 ||  || — || March 9, 2007 || Mount Lemmon || Mount Lemmon Survey ||  || align=right data-sort-value="0.58" | 580 m || 
|-id=231 bgcolor=#fefefe
| 618231 ||  || — || March 10, 2007 || Kitt Peak || Spacewatch ||  || align=right data-sort-value="0.61" | 610 m || 
|-id=232 bgcolor=#fefefe
| 618232 ||  || — || January 27, 2007 || Mount Lemmon || Mount Lemmon Survey ||  || align=right data-sort-value="0.67" | 670 m || 
|-id=233 bgcolor=#d6d6d6
| 618233 ||  || — || March 12, 2007 || Mount Lemmon || Mount Lemmon Survey ||  || align=right | 1.6 km || 
|-id=234 bgcolor=#fefefe
| 618234 ||  || — || March 10, 2007 || Mount Lemmon || Mount Lemmon Survey ||  || align=right data-sort-value="0.64" | 640 m || 
|-id=235 bgcolor=#fefefe
| 618235 ||  || — || March 9, 2007 || Mount Lemmon || Mount Lemmon Survey ||  || align=right data-sort-value="0.61" | 610 m || 
|-id=236 bgcolor=#fefefe
| 618236 ||  || — || March 9, 2007 || Mount Lemmon || Mount Lemmon Survey ||  || align=right data-sort-value="0.63" | 630 m || 
|-id=237 bgcolor=#fefefe
| 618237 ||  || — || February 26, 2007 || Mount Lemmon || Mount Lemmon Survey ||  || align=right data-sort-value="0.66" | 660 m || 
|-id=238 bgcolor=#fefefe
| 618238 ||  || — || March 14, 2007 || Kitt Peak || Spacewatch ||  || align=right data-sort-value="0.98" | 980 m || 
|-id=239 bgcolor=#fefefe
| 618239 ||  || — || March 14, 2007 || Kitt Peak || Spacewatch ||  || align=right data-sort-value="0.61" | 610 m || 
|-id=240 bgcolor=#E9E9E9
| 618240 ||  || — || March 12, 2007 || Mount Lemmon || Mount Lemmon Survey ||  || align=right | 1.9 km || 
|-id=241 bgcolor=#d6d6d6
| 618241 ||  || — || March 13, 2007 || Mauna Kea || Mauna Kea Obs. || 7:4 || align=right | 3.0 km || 
|-id=242 bgcolor=#fefefe
| 618242 ||  || — || February 6, 2007 || Kitt Peak || Spacewatch ||  || align=right data-sort-value="0.57" | 570 m || 
|-id=243 bgcolor=#fefefe
| 618243 ||  || — || March 14, 2007 || Mount Lemmon || Mount Lemmon Survey ||  || align=right data-sort-value="0.85" | 850 m || 
|-id=244 bgcolor=#d6d6d6
| 618244 ||  || — || March 11, 2007 || Mount Lemmon || Mount Lemmon Survey ||  || align=right | 1.8 km || 
|-id=245 bgcolor=#fefefe
| 618245 ||  || — || September 23, 2008 || Mount Lemmon || Mount Lemmon Survey ||  || align=right data-sort-value="0.74" | 740 m || 
|-id=246 bgcolor=#E9E9E9
| 618246 ||  || — || September 17, 2009 || Kitt Peak || Spacewatch ||  || align=right | 1.7 km || 
|-id=247 bgcolor=#E9E9E9
| 618247 ||  || — || March 9, 2007 || Mount Lemmon || Mount Lemmon Survey ||  || align=right | 2.1 km || 
|-id=248 bgcolor=#fefefe
| 618248 ||  || — || December 27, 2006 || Mount Lemmon || Mount Lemmon Survey ||  || align=right data-sort-value="0.61" | 610 m || 
|-id=249 bgcolor=#fefefe
| 618249 ||  || — || September 6, 2008 || Kitt Peak || Spacewatch ||  || align=right data-sort-value="0.56" | 560 m || 
|-id=250 bgcolor=#C2FFFF
| 618250 ||  || — || March 10, 2007 || Mount Lemmon || Mount Lemmon Survey || L5 || align=right | 6.5 km || 
|-id=251 bgcolor=#E9E9E9
| 618251 ||  || — || September 3, 2013 || Haleakala || Pan-STARRS ||  || align=right | 1.8 km || 
|-id=252 bgcolor=#fefefe
| 618252 ||  || — || March 11, 2007 || Kitt Peak || Spacewatch ||  || align=right data-sort-value="0.70" | 700 m || 
|-id=253 bgcolor=#fefefe
| 618253 ||  || — || March 12, 2007 || Kitt Peak || Spacewatch ||  || align=right data-sort-value="0.60" | 600 m || 
|-id=254 bgcolor=#C2FFFF
| 618254 ||  || — || March 9, 2007 || Kitt Peak || Spacewatch || L5 || align=right | 6.5 km || 
|-id=255 bgcolor=#fefefe
| 618255 ||  || — || March 11, 2007 || Mount Lemmon || Mount Lemmon Survey ||  || align=right data-sort-value="0.58" | 580 m || 
|-id=256 bgcolor=#fefefe
| 618256 ||  || — || March 12, 2007 || Catalina || CSS ||  || align=right data-sort-value="0.70" | 700 m || 
|-id=257 bgcolor=#fefefe
| 618257 ||  || — || March 20, 2007 || Mount Lemmon || Mount Lemmon Survey ||  || align=right data-sort-value="0.63" | 630 m || 
|-id=258 bgcolor=#C2FFFF
| 618258 ||  || — || March 26, 2007 || Mount Lemmon || Mount Lemmon Survey || L5 || align=right | 7.1 km || 
|-id=259 bgcolor=#fefefe
| 618259 ||  || — || March 26, 2007 || Kitt Peak || Spacewatch ||  || align=right data-sort-value="0.53" | 530 m || 
|-id=260 bgcolor=#fefefe
| 618260 ||  || — || February 25, 2007 || Mount Lemmon || Mount Lemmon Survey ||  || align=right data-sort-value="0.59" | 590 m || 
|-id=261 bgcolor=#C2FFFF
| 618261 ||  || — || April 14, 2007 || Mount Lemmon || Mount Lemmon Survey || L5 || align=right | 6.0 km || 
|-id=262 bgcolor=#fefefe
| 618262 ||  || — || March 13, 2007 || Mount Lemmon || Mount Lemmon Survey ||  || align=right data-sort-value="0.57" | 570 m || 
|-id=263 bgcolor=#fefefe
| 618263 ||  || — || April 14, 2007 || Mount Lemmon || Mount Lemmon Survey ||  || align=right data-sort-value="0.60" | 600 m || 
|-id=264 bgcolor=#fefefe
| 618264 ||  || — || April 14, 2007 || Kitt Peak || Spacewatch ||  || align=right data-sort-value="0.47" | 470 m || 
|-id=265 bgcolor=#fefefe
| 618265 ||  || — || April 15, 2007 || Kitt Peak || Spacewatch ||  || align=right data-sort-value="0.75" | 750 m || 
|-id=266 bgcolor=#E9E9E9
| 618266 ||  || — || April 15, 2007 || Kitt Peak || Spacewatch ||  || align=right | 2.3 km || 
|-id=267 bgcolor=#fefefe
| 618267 ||  || — || April 15, 2007 || Kitt Peak || Spacewatch ||  || align=right data-sort-value="0.71" | 710 m || 
|-id=268 bgcolor=#fefefe
| 618268 ||  || — || April 15, 2007 || Kitt Peak || Spacewatch ||  || align=right data-sort-value="0.58" | 580 m || 
|-id=269 bgcolor=#fefefe
| 618269 ||  || — || April 15, 2007 || Kitt Peak || Spacewatch ||  || align=right data-sort-value="0.63" | 630 m || 
|-id=270 bgcolor=#C2FFFF
| 618270 ||  || — || April 15, 2007 || Mount Lemmon || Mount Lemmon Survey || L5 || align=right | 6.6 km || 
|-id=271 bgcolor=#E9E9E9
| 618271 ||  || — || September 6, 2008 || Mount Lemmon || Mount Lemmon Survey ||  || align=right | 1.9 km || 
|-id=272 bgcolor=#fefefe
| 618272 ||  || — || October 25, 2016 || Haleakala || Pan-STARRS ||  || align=right data-sort-value="0.94" | 940 m || 
|-id=273 bgcolor=#fefefe
| 618273 ||  || — || April 21, 2018 || Mount Lemmon || Mount Lemmon Survey ||  || align=right data-sort-value="0.79" | 790 m || 
|-id=274 bgcolor=#fefefe
| 618274 ||  || — || March 26, 2007 || Mount Lemmon || Mount Lemmon Survey ||  || align=right data-sort-value="0.76" | 760 m || 
|-id=275 bgcolor=#fefefe
| 618275 ||  || — || March 26, 2007 || Mount Lemmon || Mount Lemmon Survey ||  || align=right data-sort-value="0.61" | 610 m || 
|-id=276 bgcolor=#fefefe
| 618276 ||  || — || March 10, 2007 || Mount Lemmon || Mount Lemmon Survey ||  || align=right data-sort-value="0.60" | 600 m || 
|-id=277 bgcolor=#fefefe
| 618277 ||  || — || April 18, 2007 || Mount Lemmon || Mount Lemmon Survey ||  || align=right data-sort-value="0.57" | 570 m || 
|-id=278 bgcolor=#fefefe
| 618278 ||  || — || August 23, 2004 || Kitt Peak || Spacewatch ||  || align=right data-sort-value="0.62" | 620 m || 
|-id=279 bgcolor=#fefefe
| 618279 ||  || — || April 16, 2007 || Catalina || CSS ||  || align=right data-sort-value="0.90" | 900 m || 
|-id=280 bgcolor=#fefefe
| 618280 ||  || — || March 15, 2007 || Kitt Peak || Spacewatch ||  || align=right data-sort-value="0.59" | 590 m || 
|-id=281 bgcolor=#fefefe
| 618281 ||  || — || April 20, 2007 || Kitt Peak || Spacewatch ||  || align=right data-sort-value="0.67" | 670 m || 
|-id=282 bgcolor=#fefefe
| 618282 ||  || — || March 26, 2007 || Mount Lemmon || Mount Lemmon Survey ||  || align=right data-sort-value="0.59" | 590 m || 
|-id=283 bgcolor=#C2FFFF
| 618283 ||  || — || March 25, 2007 || Mount Lemmon || Mount Lemmon Survey || L5 || align=right | 11 km || 
|-id=284 bgcolor=#fefefe
| 618284 ||  || — || April 22, 2007 || Mount Lemmon || Mount Lemmon Survey ||  || align=right data-sort-value="0.97" | 970 m || 
|-id=285 bgcolor=#fefefe
| 618285 ||  || — || April 23, 2007 || Kitt Peak || Spacewatch ||  || align=right data-sort-value="0.68" | 680 m || 
|-id=286 bgcolor=#fefefe
| 618286 ||  || — || April 23, 2007 || Catalina || CSS ||  || align=right data-sort-value="0.78" | 780 m || 
|-id=287 bgcolor=#fefefe
| 618287 ||  || — || October 10, 2015 || Haleakala || Pan-STARRS ||  || align=right data-sort-value="0.51" | 510 m || 
|-id=288 bgcolor=#C2FFFF
| 618288 ||  || — || April 26, 2007 || Mount Lemmon || Mount Lemmon Survey || L5 || align=right | 8.6 km || 
|-id=289 bgcolor=#C2FFFF
| 618289 ||  || — || September 17, 2012 || Mount Lemmon || Mount Lemmon Survey || L5 || align=right | 7.4 km || 
|-id=290 bgcolor=#fefefe
| 618290 ||  || — || April 22, 2007 || Kitt Peak || Spacewatch ||  || align=right data-sort-value="0.60" | 600 m || 
|-id=291 bgcolor=#fefefe
| 618291 ||  || — || November 9, 2008 || Kitt Peak || Spacewatch ||  || align=right data-sort-value="0.68" | 680 m || 
|-id=292 bgcolor=#fefefe
| 618292 ||  || — || October 7, 2008 || Mount Lemmon || Mount Lemmon Survey ||  || align=right data-sort-value="0.73" | 730 m || 
|-id=293 bgcolor=#d6d6d6
| 618293 ||  || — || February 26, 2011 || Mount Lemmon || Mount Lemmon Survey ||  || align=right | 2.0 km || 
|-id=294 bgcolor=#fefefe
| 618294 ||  || — || February 28, 2014 || Haleakala || Pan-STARRS ||  || align=right data-sort-value="0.56" | 560 m || 
|-id=295 bgcolor=#C2FFFF
| 618295 ||  || — || September 15, 2012 || Mount Lemmon || Mount Lemmon Survey || L5 || align=right | 7.5 km || 
|-id=296 bgcolor=#fefefe
| 618296 ||  || — || January 29, 2014 || Kitt Peak || Spacewatch ||  || align=right data-sort-value="0.66" | 660 m || 
|-id=297 bgcolor=#fefefe
| 618297 ||  || — || April 22, 2007 || Mount Lemmon || Mount Lemmon Survey ||  || align=right data-sort-value="0.56" | 560 m || 
|-id=298 bgcolor=#d6d6d6
| 618298 ||  || — || April 16, 2007 || Mount Lemmon || Mount Lemmon Survey ||  || align=right | 1.7 km || 
|-id=299 bgcolor=#fefefe
| 618299 ||  || — || April 23, 2007 || Mount Lemmon || Mount Lemmon Survey ||  || align=right data-sort-value="0.60" | 600 m || 
|-id=300 bgcolor=#fefefe
| 618300 ||  || — || May 12, 2007 || Mount Lemmon || Mount Lemmon Survey ||  || align=right data-sort-value="0.95" | 950 m || 
|}

618301–618400 

|-bgcolor=#fefefe
| 618301 ||  || — || May 9, 2007 || Mount Lemmon || Mount Lemmon Survey ||  || align=right data-sort-value="0.65" | 650 m || 
|-id=302 bgcolor=#E9E9E9
| 618302 ||  || — || January 23, 2006 || Kitt Peak || Spacewatch ||  || align=right | 2.5 km || 
|-id=303 bgcolor=#fefefe
| 618303 ||  || — || May 9, 2007 || Mount Lemmon || Mount Lemmon Survey ||  || align=right data-sort-value="0.51" | 510 m || 
|-id=304 bgcolor=#fefefe
| 618304 ||  || — || May 24, 2007 || Mount Lemmon || Mount Lemmon Survey ||  || align=right data-sort-value="0.63" | 630 m || 
|-id=305 bgcolor=#fefefe
| 618305 ||  || — || May 25, 2007 || Mount Lemmon || Mount Lemmon Survey ||  || align=right data-sort-value="0.60" | 600 m || 
|-id=306 bgcolor=#fefefe
| 618306 ||  || — || June 11, 2007 || Lake Tekapo || A. C. Gilmore || H || align=right data-sort-value="0.63" | 630 m || 
|-id=307 bgcolor=#fefefe
| 618307 ||  || — || May 11, 2007 || Mount Lemmon || Mount Lemmon Survey ||  || align=right data-sort-value="0.55" | 550 m || 
|-id=308 bgcolor=#fefefe
| 618308 ||  || — || June 13, 2007 || Kitt Peak || Spacewatch ||  || align=right data-sort-value="0.69" | 690 m || 
|-id=309 bgcolor=#d6d6d6
| 618309 ||  || — || May 10, 2007 || Mount Lemmon || Mount Lemmon Survey ||  || align=right | 1.7 km || 
|-id=310 bgcolor=#fefefe
| 618310 ||  || — || May 12, 2007 || Kitt Peak || Spacewatch ||  || align=right data-sort-value="0.63" | 630 m || 
|-id=311 bgcolor=#fefefe
| 618311 ||  || — || May 22, 2003 || Kitt Peak || Spacewatch ||  || align=right data-sort-value="0.60" | 600 m || 
|-id=312 bgcolor=#fefefe
| 618312 ||  || — || June 22, 2007 || Kitt Peak || Spacewatch ||  || align=right data-sort-value="0.67" | 670 m || 
|-id=313 bgcolor=#fefefe
| 618313 ||  || — || February 7, 2006 || Catalina || CSS ||  || align=right | 1.1 km || 
|-id=314 bgcolor=#fefefe
| 618314 ||  || — || June 20, 2007 || La Sagra || OAM Obs. ||  || align=right data-sort-value="0.88" | 880 m || 
|-id=315 bgcolor=#d6d6d6
| 618315 ||  || — || June 24, 2007 || Kitt Peak || Spacewatch ||  || align=right | 2.3 km || 
|-id=316 bgcolor=#fefefe
| 618316 ||  || — || August 8, 2007 || Socorro || LINEAR ||  || align=right data-sort-value="0.69" | 690 m || 
|-id=317 bgcolor=#fefefe
| 618317 ||  || — || August 13, 2007 || XuYi || PMO NEO ||  || align=right data-sort-value="0.80" | 800 m || 
|-id=318 bgcolor=#d6d6d6
| 618318 ||  || — || August 31, 2007 || Siding Spring || K. Sárneczky, L. Kiss ||  || align=right | 2.4 km || 
|-id=319 bgcolor=#d6d6d6
| 618319 ||  || — || August 24, 2007 || Kitt Peak || Spacewatch ||  || align=right | 2.2 km || 
|-id=320 bgcolor=#d6d6d6
| 618320 ||  || — || August 10, 2007 || Kitt Peak || Spacewatch ||  || align=right | 2.3 km || 
|-id=321 bgcolor=#d6d6d6
| 618321 ||  || — || September 9, 2007 || Kitt Peak || Spacewatch ||  || align=right | 2.7 km || 
|-id=322 bgcolor=#d6d6d6
| 618322 ||  || — || September 9, 2007 || Kitt Peak || Spacewatch ||  || align=right | 1.8 km || 
|-id=323 bgcolor=#d6d6d6
| 618323 ||  || — || September 10, 2007 || Kitt Peak || Spacewatch ||  || align=right | 2.0 km || 
|-id=324 bgcolor=#fefefe
| 618324 ||  || — || August 10, 2007 || Kitt Peak || Spacewatch ||  || align=right data-sort-value="0.64" | 640 m || 
|-id=325 bgcolor=#d6d6d6
| 618325 ||  || — || March 10, 2005 || Kitt Peak || M. W. Buie, L. H. Wasserman ||  || align=right | 1.8 km || 
|-id=326 bgcolor=#d6d6d6
| 618326 ||  || — || September 10, 2007 || Mount Lemmon || Mount Lemmon Survey ||  || align=right | 1.9 km || 
|-id=327 bgcolor=#d6d6d6
| 618327 ||  || — || September 10, 2007 || Mount Lemmon || Mount Lemmon Survey ||  || align=right | 2.8 km || 
|-id=328 bgcolor=#d6d6d6
| 618328 ||  || — || August 10, 2007 || Kitt Peak || Spacewatch ||  || align=right | 2.2 km || 
|-id=329 bgcolor=#fefefe
| 618329 ||  || — || September 11, 2007 || Mount Lemmon || Mount Lemmon Survey ||  || align=right data-sort-value="0.62" | 620 m || 
|-id=330 bgcolor=#d6d6d6
| 618330 ||  || — || August 16, 2007 || XuYi || PMO NEO ||  || align=right | 2.1 km || 
|-id=331 bgcolor=#fefefe
| 618331 ||  || — || September 10, 2007 || Catalina || CSS ||  || align=right | 1.1 km || 
|-id=332 bgcolor=#d6d6d6
| 618332 ||  || — || September 12, 2007 || Kitt Peak || Spacewatch ||  || align=right | 1.8 km || 
|-id=333 bgcolor=#d6d6d6
| 618333 ||  || — || September 12, 2007 || Kitt Peak || Spacewatch ||  || align=right | 2.2 km || 
|-id=334 bgcolor=#fefefe
| 618334 ||  || — || September 13, 2007 || Mount Lemmon || Mount Lemmon Survey ||  || align=right data-sort-value="0.78" | 780 m || 
|-id=335 bgcolor=#d6d6d6
| 618335 ||  || — || September 13, 2007 || Kitt Peak || Spacewatch ||  || align=right | 2.8 km || 
|-id=336 bgcolor=#d6d6d6
| 618336 ||  || — || September 14, 2007 || Kitt Peak || Spacewatch ||  || align=right | 2.1 km || 
|-id=337 bgcolor=#d6d6d6
| 618337 ||  || — || September 10, 2007 || Kitt Peak || Spacewatch ||  || align=right | 2.6 km || 
|-id=338 bgcolor=#d6d6d6
| 618338 ||  || — || September 14, 2007 || Kitt Peak || Spacewatch ||  || align=right | 2.4 km || 
|-id=339 bgcolor=#d6d6d6
| 618339 ||  || — || September 14, 2007 || Kitt Peak || Spacewatch ||  || align=right | 1.9 km || 
|-id=340 bgcolor=#E9E9E9
| 618340 ||  || — || April 12, 2005 || Kitt Peak || Kitt Peak Obs. ||  || align=right data-sort-value="0.69" | 690 m || 
|-id=341 bgcolor=#d6d6d6
| 618341 ||  || — || September 9, 2007 || Mount Lemmon || Mount Lemmon Survey ||  || align=right | 1.9 km || 
|-id=342 bgcolor=#d6d6d6
| 618342 ||  || — || September 11, 2007 || Mount Lemmon || Mount Lemmon Survey ||  || align=right | 1.8 km || 
|-id=343 bgcolor=#d6d6d6
| 618343 ||  || — || September 13, 2007 || Kitt Peak || Spacewatch ||  || align=right | 1.6 km || 
|-id=344 bgcolor=#d6d6d6
| 618344 ||  || — || July 29, 2017 || Haleakala || Pan-STARRS ||  || align=right | 2.5 km || 
|-id=345 bgcolor=#E9E9E9
| 618345 ||  || — || January 18, 2009 || Kitt Peak || Spacewatch ||  || align=right data-sort-value="0.67" | 670 m || 
|-id=346 bgcolor=#E9E9E9
| 618346 ||  || — || September 10, 2007 || Kitt Peak || Spacewatch ||  || align=right data-sort-value="0.88" | 880 m || 
|-id=347 bgcolor=#d6d6d6
| 618347 ||  || — || September 8, 2007 || Anderson Mesa || LONEOS ||  || align=right | 2.9 km || 
|-id=348 bgcolor=#FFC2E0
| 618348 ||  || — || August 2, 2016 || Haleakala || ATLAS ||  || align=right data-sort-value="0.32" | 320 m || 
|-id=349 bgcolor=#FA8072
| 618349 ||  || — || September 25, 2017 || Haleakala || ATLAS ||  || align=right data-sort-value="0.69" | 690 m || 
|-id=350 bgcolor=#FFC2E0
| 618350 ||  || — || August 7, 2021 || Mauna Loa || ATLAS ||  || align=right data-sort-value="0.36" | 360 m || 
|-id=351 bgcolor=#d6d6d6
| 618351 ||  || — || November 28, 1994 || Kitt Peak || Spacewatch ||  || align=right | 2.4 km || 
|-id=352 bgcolor=#d6d6d6
| 618352 ||  || — || July 22, 1995 || Kitt Peak || Spacewatch ||  || align=right | 2.2 km || 
|-id=353 bgcolor=#E9E9E9
| 618353 ||  || — || September 18, 1995 || Kitt Peak || Spacewatch ||  || align=right | 1.7 km || 
|-id=354 bgcolor=#E9E9E9
| 618354 ||  || — || September 19, 1995 || Kitt Peak || Spacewatch ||  || align=right | 1.5 km || 
|-id=355 bgcolor=#E9E9E9
| 618355 ||  || — || September 26, 1995 || Kitt Peak || Spacewatch ||  || align=right | 1.6 km || 
|-id=356 bgcolor=#d6d6d6
| 618356 ||  || — || October 15, 1995 || Kitt Peak || Spacewatch ||  || align=right | 2.9 km || 
|-id=357 bgcolor=#d6d6d6
| 618357 ||  || — || October 23, 1995 || Kitt Peak || Spacewatch ||  || align=right | 2.3 km || 
|-id=358 bgcolor=#d6d6d6
| 618358 ||  || — || October 19, 1995 || Kitt Peak || Spacewatch ||  || align=right | 2.3 km || 
|-id=359 bgcolor=#d6d6d6
| 618359 ||  || — || November 19, 1995 || Kitt Peak || Spacewatch ||  || align=right | 2.5 km || 
|-id=360 bgcolor=#d6d6d6
| 618360 ||  || — || September 24, 2011 || Haleakala || Pan-STARRS ||  || align=right | 2.9 km || 
|-id=361 bgcolor=#fefefe
| 618361 ||  || — || January 12, 1996 || Kitt Peak || Spacewatch ||  || align=right data-sort-value="0.58" | 580 m || 
|-id=362 bgcolor=#E9E9E9
| 618362 ||  || — || March 20, 1996 || Kitt Peak || Spacewatch ||  || align=right data-sort-value="0.92" | 920 m || 
|-id=363 bgcolor=#E9E9E9
| 618363 ||  || — || July 16, 2013 || Haleakala || Pan-STARRS ||  || align=right | 1.1 km || 
|-id=364 bgcolor=#fefefe
| 618364 ||  || — || December 19, 2004 || Mount Lemmon || Mount Lemmon Survey ||  || align=right data-sort-value="0.63" | 630 m || 
|-id=365 bgcolor=#fefefe
| 618365 ||  || — || November 8, 1996 || Kitt Peak || Spacewatch ||  || align=right data-sort-value="0.66" | 660 m || 
|-id=366 bgcolor=#fefefe
| 618366 ||  || — || November 9, 1996 || Kitt Peak || Spacewatch ||  || align=right data-sort-value="0.69" | 690 m || 
|-id=367 bgcolor=#d6d6d6
| 618367 ||  || — || December 4, 1996 || Kitt Peak || Spacewatch ||  || align=right | 2.9 km || 
|-id=368 bgcolor=#E9E9E9
| 618368 ||  || — || January 31, 1997 || Kitt Peak || Spacewatch ||  || align=right | 2.4 km || 
|-id=369 bgcolor=#d6d6d6
| 618369 ||  || — || January 17, 2013 || Kitt Peak || Spacewatch ||  || align=right | 2.3 km || 
|-id=370 bgcolor=#E9E9E9
| 618370 ||  || — || October 2, 1997 || Kitt Peak || Spacewatch ||  || align=right | 2.0 km || 
|-id=371 bgcolor=#fefefe
| 618371 ||  || — || October 23, 1997 || Kitt Peak || Spacewatch ||  || align=right data-sort-value="0.67" | 670 m || 
|-id=372 bgcolor=#E9E9E9
| 618372 ||  || — || October 23, 1997 || Kitt Peak || Spacewatch ||  || align=right data-sort-value="0.92" | 920 m || 
|-id=373 bgcolor=#d6d6d6
| 618373 ||  || — || November 23, 1997 || Kitt Peak || Spacewatch ||  || align=right | 1.9 km || 
|-id=374 bgcolor=#E9E9E9
| 618374 ||  || — || February 23, 1998 || Kitt Peak || Spacewatch ||  || align=right | 1.4 km || 
|-id=375 bgcolor=#fefefe
| 618375 ||  || — || April 18, 1998 || Kitt Peak || Spacewatch ||  || align=right data-sort-value="0.83" | 830 m || 
|-id=376 bgcolor=#fefefe
| 618376 ||  || — || July 12, 2015 || Haleakala || Pan-STARRS ||  || align=right data-sort-value="0.56" | 560 m || 
|-id=377 bgcolor=#fefefe
| 618377 ||  || — || October 15, 1998 || Kitt Peak || Spacewatch ||  || align=right data-sort-value="0.60" | 600 m || 
|-id=378 bgcolor=#E9E9E9
| 618378 ||  || — || October 23, 1998 || Kitt Peak || Spacewatch ||  || align=right | 1.1 km || 
|-id=379 bgcolor=#d6d6d6
| 618379 ||  || — || September 13, 2012 || Mount Lemmon || Mount Lemmon Survey ||  || align=right | 2.2 km || 
|-id=380 bgcolor=#d6d6d6
| 618380 ||  || — || December 10, 1998 || Kitt Peak || Spacewatch ||  || align=right | 3.4 km || 
|-id=381 bgcolor=#d6d6d6
| 618381 ||  || — || August 10, 2012 || Kitt Peak || Spacewatch ||  || align=right | 2.0 km || 
|-id=382 bgcolor=#E9E9E9
| 618382 ||  || — || January 9, 1999 || Kitt Peak || Spacewatch ||  || align=right | 1.1 km || 
|-id=383 bgcolor=#E9E9E9
| 618383 ||  || — || January 15, 1999 || Kitt Peak || Spacewatch ||  || align=right data-sort-value="0.82" | 820 m || 
|-id=384 bgcolor=#d6d6d6
| 618384 ||  || — || January 10, 1999 || Kitt Peak || Spacewatch ||  || align=right | 2.3 km || 
|-id=385 bgcolor=#E9E9E9
| 618385 ||  || — || November 10, 2006 || Kitt Peak || Spacewatch ||  || align=right data-sort-value="0.78" | 780 m || 
|-id=386 bgcolor=#E9E9E9
| 618386 ||  || — || March 10, 1999 || Kitt Peak || Spacewatch ||  || align=right | 1.9 km || 
|-id=387 bgcolor=#d6d6d6
| 618387 ||  || — || October 20, 2012 || Haleakala || Pan-STARRS ||  || align=right | 2.8 km || 
|-id=388 bgcolor=#fefefe
| 618388 ||  || — || November 26, 2012 || Mount Lemmon || Mount Lemmon Survey ||  || align=right data-sort-value="0.63" | 630 m || 
|-id=389 bgcolor=#fefefe
| 618389 ||  || — || September 7, 1999 || Kitt Peak || Spacewatch ||  || align=right data-sort-value="0.65" | 650 m || 
|-id=390 bgcolor=#d6d6d6
| 618390 ||  || — || September 5, 1999 || Kitt Peak || Spacewatch ||  || align=right | 2.9 km || 
|-id=391 bgcolor=#fefefe
| 618391 ||  || — || September 28, 2003 || Kitt Peak || Spacewatch ||  || align=right data-sort-value="0.57" | 570 m || 
|-id=392 bgcolor=#fefefe
| 618392 ||  || — || September 30, 1999 || Kitt Peak || Spacewatch ||  || align=right data-sort-value="0.60" | 600 m || 
|-id=393 bgcolor=#fefefe
| 618393 ||  || — || September 18, 2003 || Kitt Peak || Spacewatch ||  || align=right data-sort-value="0.79" | 790 m || 
|-id=394 bgcolor=#E9E9E9
| 618394 ||  || — || October 5, 1999 || Kitt Peak || Spacewatch ||  || align=right | 1.6 km || 
|-id=395 bgcolor=#E9E9E9
| 618395 ||  || — || October 6, 1999 || Kitt Peak || Spacewatch ||  || align=right | 2.1 km || 
|-id=396 bgcolor=#fefefe
| 618396 ||  || — || October 9, 1999 || Kitt Peak || Spacewatch ||  || align=right data-sort-value="0.68" | 680 m || 
|-id=397 bgcolor=#fefefe
| 618397 ||  || — || October 6, 1999 || Socorro || LINEAR ||  || align=right data-sort-value="0.64" | 640 m || 
|-id=398 bgcolor=#d6d6d6
| 618398 ||  || — || October 2, 1999 || Kitt Peak || Spacewatch ||  || align=right | 2.1 km || 
|-id=399 bgcolor=#E9E9E9
| 618399 ||  || — || September 14, 1994 || Kitt Peak || Spacewatch ||  || align=right | 2.0 km || 
|-id=400 bgcolor=#d6d6d6
| 618400 ||  || — || March 1, 2008 || Kitt Peak || Spacewatch ||  || align=right | 2.6 km || 
|}

618401–618500 

|-bgcolor=#fefefe
| 618401 ||  || — || October 21, 2016 || Mount Lemmon || Mount Lemmon Survey ||  || align=right data-sort-value="0.57" | 570 m || 
|-id=402 bgcolor=#fefefe
| 618402 ||  || — || August 31, 2017 || Mount Lemmon || Mount Lemmon Survey || H || align=right data-sort-value="0.43" | 430 m || 
|-id=403 bgcolor=#E9E9E9
| 618403 ||  || — || November 1, 1999 || Kitt Peak || Spacewatch ||  || align=right | 2.2 km || 
|-id=404 bgcolor=#d6d6d6
| 618404 ||  || — || November 17, 1999 || Kitt Peak || Spacewatch ||  || align=right | 2.1 km || 
|-id=405 bgcolor=#E9E9E9
| 618405 ||  || — || September 23, 2008 || Kitt Peak || Spacewatch ||  || align=right | 2.0 km || 
|-id=406 bgcolor=#d6d6d6
| 618406 ||  || — || December 16, 1999 || Kitt Peak || Spacewatch ||  || align=right | 2.1 km || 
|-id=407 bgcolor=#fefefe
| 618407 ||  || — || May 27, 2006 || Catalina || CSS || H || align=right data-sort-value="0.58" | 580 m || 
|-id=408 bgcolor=#fefefe
| 618408 ||  || — || January 9, 2000 || Kitt Peak || Spacewatch ||  || align=right data-sort-value="0.68" | 680 m || 
|-id=409 bgcolor=#fefefe
| 618409 ||  || — || February 1, 2000 || Kitt Peak || Spacewatch ||  || align=right data-sort-value="0.52" | 520 m || 
|-id=410 bgcolor=#d6d6d6
| 618410 ||  || — || February 5, 2000 || Kitt Peak || Spacewatch ||  || align=right | 2.1 km || 
|-id=411 bgcolor=#d6d6d6
| 618411 ||  || — || February 3, 2000 || Kitt Peak || Spacewatch ||  || align=right | 3.2 km || 
|-id=412 bgcolor=#fefefe
| 618412 ||  || — || August 25, 2012 || Mount Lemmon || Mount Lemmon Survey ||  || align=right data-sort-value="0.55" | 550 m || 
|-id=413 bgcolor=#E9E9E9
| 618413 ||  || — || January 26, 2012 || Mount Lemmon || Mount Lemmon Survey ||  || align=right data-sort-value="0.73" | 730 m || 
|-id=414 bgcolor=#E9E9E9
| 618414 ||  || — || March 3, 2000 || Kitt Peak || Spacewatch ||  || align=right data-sort-value="0.98" | 980 m || 
|-id=415 bgcolor=#E9E9E9
| 618415 ||  || — || January 28, 2000 || Kitt Peak || Spacewatch ||  || align=right data-sort-value="0.99" | 990 m || 
|-id=416 bgcolor=#E9E9E9
| 618416 ||  || — || August 22, 2014 || Haleakala || Pan-STARRS ||  || align=right data-sort-value="0.74" | 740 m || 
|-id=417 bgcolor=#fefefe
| 618417 ||  || — || February 27, 2008 || Mount Lemmon || Mount Lemmon Survey || H || align=right data-sort-value="0.55" | 550 m || 
|-id=418 bgcolor=#E9E9E9
| 618418 ||  || — || April 2, 2000 || Kitt Peak || Spacewatch ||  || align=right data-sort-value="0.93" | 930 m || 
|-id=419 bgcolor=#E9E9E9
| 618419 ||  || — || April 5, 2000 || Kitt Peak || Spacewatch ||  || align=right | 1.2 km || 
|-id=420 bgcolor=#E9E9E9
| 618420 ||  || — || April 25, 2000 || Kitt Peak || Spacewatch ||  || align=right | 1.3 km || 
|-id=421 bgcolor=#fefefe
| 618421 ||  || — || May 24, 2000 || Mauna Kea || C. Veillet ||  || align=right data-sort-value="0.70" | 700 m || 
|-id=422 bgcolor=#E9E9E9
| 618422 ||  || — || June 4, 2000 || Haleakala || AMOS ||  || align=right | 1.5 km || 
|-id=423 bgcolor=#E9E9E9
| 618423 ||  || — || July 23, 2000 || Socorro || LINEAR ||  || align=right | 1.9 km || 
|-id=424 bgcolor=#d6d6d6
| 618424 ||  || — || July 28, 2011 || Haleakala || Pan-STARRS ||  || align=right | 2.4 km || 
|-id=425 bgcolor=#fefefe
| 618425 ||  || — || December 4, 2005 || Kitt Peak || Spacewatch ||  || align=right data-sort-value="0.69" | 690 m || 
|-id=426 bgcolor=#d6d6d6
| 618426 ||  || — || August 31, 2011 || Haleakala || Pan-STARRS ||  || align=right | 2.4 km || 
|-id=427 bgcolor=#E9E9E9
| 618427 ||  || — || January 10, 2007 || Kitt Peak || Spacewatch ||  || align=right data-sort-value="0.99" | 990 m || 
|-id=428 bgcolor=#fefefe
| 618428 ||  || — || November 19, 2008 || Mount Lemmon || Mount Lemmon Survey ||  || align=right data-sort-value="0.58" | 580 m || 
|-id=429 bgcolor=#E9E9E9
| 618429 ||  || — || February 9, 2016 || Haleakala || Pan-STARRS ||  || align=right | 1.2 km || 
|-id=430 bgcolor=#E9E9E9
| 618430 ||  || — || August 26, 2000 || Cerro Tololo || R. Millis, L. H. Wasserman ||  || align=right | 1.6 km || 
|-id=431 bgcolor=#d6d6d6
| 618431 ||  || — || August 28, 2000 || Cerro Tololo || R. Millis, L. H. Wasserman ||  || align=right | 3.0 km || 
|-id=432 bgcolor=#C2FFFF
| 618432 ||  || — || August 26, 2012 || Haleakala || Pan-STARRS || Tj (2.99) || align=right | 6.5 km || 
|-id=433 bgcolor=#C2FFFF
| 618433 ||  || — || October 4, 2013 || Mount Lemmon || Mount Lemmon Survey || Tj (2.93) || align=right | 7.4 km || 
|-id=434 bgcolor=#d6d6d6
| 618434 ||  || — || August 25, 2000 || Cerro Tololo || R. Millis, L. H. Wasserman ||  || align=right | 2.3 km || 
|-id=435 bgcolor=#d6d6d6
| 618435 ||  || — || October 19, 2006 || Mount Lemmon || Mount Lemmon Survey ||  || align=right | 1.4 km || 
|-id=436 bgcolor=#d6d6d6
| 618436 ||  || — || February 2, 2008 || Mount Lemmon || Mount Lemmon Survey ||  || align=right | 2.2 km || 
|-id=437 bgcolor=#fefefe
| 618437 ||  || — || October 15, 2004 || Kitt Peak || Spacewatch ||  || align=right data-sort-value="0.51" | 510 m || 
|-id=438 bgcolor=#E9E9E9
| 618438 ||  || — || November 17, 2014 || Mount Lemmon || Mount Lemmon Survey ||  || align=right | 1.1 km || 
|-id=439 bgcolor=#d6d6d6
| 618439 ||  || — || December 30, 2013 || Mount Lemmon || Mount Lemmon Survey ||  || align=right | 2.4 km || 
|-id=440 bgcolor=#E9E9E9
| 618440 ||  || — || July 15, 2013 || Haleakala || Pan-STARRS ||  || align=right | 1.0 km || 
|-id=441 bgcolor=#d6d6d6
| 618441 ||  || — || December 18, 2007 || Mount Lemmon || Mount Lemmon Survey ||  || align=right | 2.8 km || 
|-id=442 bgcolor=#fefefe
| 618442 ||  || — || March 13, 2010 || Kitt Peak || Spacewatch ||  || align=right data-sort-value="0.70" | 700 m || 
|-id=443 bgcolor=#d6d6d6
| 618443 ||  || — || January 9, 2014 || Catalina || CSS ||  || align=right | 2.9 km || 
|-id=444 bgcolor=#C2FFFF
| 618444 ||  || — || April 1, 2008 || Kitt Peak || Spacewatch || Tj (2.93) || align=right | 7.7 km || 
|-id=445 bgcolor=#d6d6d6
| 618445 ||  || — || February 28, 2008 || Kitt Peak || Spacewatch ||  || align=right | 2.0 km || 
|-id=446 bgcolor=#d6d6d6
| 618446 ||  || — || October 14, 2017 || Mount Lemmon || Mount Lemmon Survey ||  || align=right | 2.3 km || 
|-id=447 bgcolor=#fefefe
| 618447 ||  || — || October 2, 2000 || Socorro || LINEAR ||  || align=right | 1.0 km || 
|-id=448 bgcolor=#d6d6d6
| 618448 ||  || — || September 30, 2006 || Catalina || CSS ||  || align=right | 2.5 km || 
|-id=449 bgcolor=#C2FFFF
| 618449 ||  || — || March 12, 2007 || Kitt Peak || Spacewatch || Tj (2.83) || align=right | 9.1 km || 
|-id=450 bgcolor=#d6d6d6
| 618450 ||  || — || September 21, 2011 || Mount Lemmon || Mount Lemmon Survey ||  || align=right | 2.5 km || 
|-id=451 bgcolor=#E9E9E9
| 618451 ||  || — || September 18, 2009 || Kitt Peak || Spacewatch ||  || align=right | 1.2 km || 
|-id=452 bgcolor=#d6d6d6
| 618452 ||  || — || August 7, 2016 || Haleakala || Pan-STARRS ||  || align=right | 2.6 km || 
|-id=453 bgcolor=#d6d6d6
| 618453 ||  || — || November 22, 2006 || Kitt Peak || Spacewatch ||  || align=right | 2.8 km || 
|-id=454 bgcolor=#d6d6d6
| 618454 ||  || — || July 11, 2016 || Haleakala || Pan-STARRS ||  || align=right | 2.5 km || 
|-id=455 bgcolor=#d6d6d6
| 618455 ||  || — || February 8, 2008 || Kitt Peak || Spacewatch ||  || align=right | 2.5 km || 
|-id=456 bgcolor=#d6d6d6
| 618456 ||  || — || February 13, 2008 || Kitt Peak || Spacewatch ||  || align=right | 2.3 km || 
|-id=457 bgcolor=#d6d6d6
| 618457 ||  || — || September 29, 2017 || Haleakala || Pan-STARRS ||  || align=right | 2.1 km || 
|-id=458 bgcolor=#fefefe
| 618458 ||  || — || November 17, 2011 || Kitt Peak || Spacewatch ||  || align=right data-sort-value="0.48" | 480 m || 
|-id=459 bgcolor=#d6d6d6
| 618459 ||  || — || December 10, 2006 || Kitt Peak || Spacewatch ||  || align=right | 2.5 km || 
|-id=460 bgcolor=#d6d6d6
| 618460 ||  || — || April 11, 2003 || Kitt Peak || Spacewatch ||  || align=right | 2.9 km || 
|-id=461 bgcolor=#fefefe
| 618461 ||  || — || January 19, 2005 || Kitt Peak || Spacewatch ||  || align=right data-sort-value="0.59" | 590 m || 
|-id=462 bgcolor=#d6d6d6
| 618462 ||  || — || January 18, 2015 || Haleakala || Pan-STARRS ||  || align=right | 1.9 km || 
|-id=463 bgcolor=#fefefe
| 618463 ||  || — || October 22, 2006 || Mount Lemmon || Mount Lemmon Survey ||  || align=right data-sort-value="0.62" | 620 m || 
|-id=464 bgcolor=#E9E9E9
| 618464 ||  || — || February 16, 2015 || Haleakala || Pan-STARRS ||  || align=right | 2.3 km || 
|-id=465 bgcolor=#E9E9E9
| 618465 ||  || — || September 22, 2003 || Kitt Peak || Spacewatch ||  || align=right | 2.4 km || 
|-id=466 bgcolor=#d6d6d6
| 618466 ||  || — || October 18, 2008 || Kitt Peak || Spacewatch ||  || align=right | 1.6 km || 
|-id=467 bgcolor=#d6d6d6
| 618467 ||  || — || March 25, 2001 || Kitt Peak || M. W. Buie, S. D. Kern ||  || align=right | 1.6 km || 
|-id=468 bgcolor=#d6d6d6
| 618468 ||  || — || March 24, 2006 || Mount Lemmon || Mount Lemmon Survey ||  || align=right | 1.9 km || 
|-id=469 bgcolor=#d6d6d6
| 618469 ||  || — || October 1, 2003 || Anderson Mesa || LONEOS ||  || align=right | 2.7 km || 
|-id=470 bgcolor=#d6d6d6
| 618470 ||  || — || August 2, 2016 || Haleakala || Pan-STARRS || 7:4 || align=right | 3.0 km || 
|-id=471 bgcolor=#d6d6d6
| 618471 ||  || — || April 7, 2006 || Kitt Peak || Spacewatch ||  || align=right | 2.3 km || 
|-id=472 bgcolor=#fefefe
| 618472 ||  || — || September 20, 2009 || Mount Lemmon || Mount Lemmon Survey ||  || align=right data-sort-value="0.87" | 870 m || 
|-id=473 bgcolor=#d6d6d6
| 618473 ||  || — || November 30, 2003 || Kitt Peak || Spacewatch ||  || align=right | 2.1 km || 
|-id=474 bgcolor=#E9E9E9
| 618474 ||  || — || December 14, 2010 || Mount Lemmon || Mount Lemmon Survey ||  || align=right | 1.1 km || 
|-id=475 bgcolor=#d6d6d6
| 618475 ||  || — || October 27, 2008 || Kitt Peak || Spacewatch ||  || align=right | 2.0 km || 
|-id=476 bgcolor=#d6d6d6
| 618476 ||  || — || August 10, 2007 || Kitt Peak || Spacewatch ||  || align=right | 1.9 km || 
|-id=477 bgcolor=#fefefe
| 618477 ||  || — || May 21, 2001 || Cerro Tololo || J. L. Elliot, L. H. Wasserman ||  || align=right data-sort-value="0.53" | 530 m || 
|-id=478 bgcolor=#E9E9E9
| 618478 ||  || — || January 31, 2016 || Mount Lemmon || Mount Lemmon Survey ||  || align=right | 1.6 km || 
|-id=479 bgcolor=#FA8072
| 618479 ||  || — || June 27, 2001 || Palomar || NEAT ||  || align=right data-sort-value="0.76" | 760 m || 
|-id=480 bgcolor=#E9E9E9
| 618480 ||  || — || July 21, 2001 || Palomar || NEAT ||  || align=right | 1.6 km || 
|-id=481 bgcolor=#E9E9E9
| 618481 ||  || — || July 19, 2001 || Palomar || NEAT ||  || align=right | 1.6 km || 
|-id=482 bgcolor=#E9E9E9
| 618482 ||  || — || June 30, 2001 || Palomar || NEAT ||  || align=right | 1.4 km || 
|-id=483 bgcolor=#E9E9E9
| 618483 ||  || — || April 12, 2013 || Haleakala || Pan-STARRS ||  || align=right | 1.7 km || 
|-id=484 bgcolor=#fefefe
| 618484 ||  || — || August 14, 2001 || Haleakala || AMOS ||  || align=right data-sort-value="0.70" | 700 m || 
|-id=485 bgcolor=#E9E9E9
| 618485 ||  || — || August 16, 2001 || Palomar || NEAT ||  || align=right | 1.3 km || 
|-id=486 bgcolor=#E9E9E9
| 618486 ||  || — || August 23, 2001 || Socorro || LINEAR ||  || align=right | 1.9 km || 
|-id=487 bgcolor=#E9E9E9
| 618487 ||  || — || July 25, 2001 || Haleakala || AMOS ||  || align=right data-sort-value="0.94" | 940 m || 
|-id=488 bgcolor=#E9E9E9
| 618488 ||  || — || August 19, 2001 || Socorro || LINEAR ||  || align=right data-sort-value="0.92" | 920 m || 
|-id=489 bgcolor=#d6d6d6
| 618489 ||  || — || August 19, 2001 || Cerro Tololo || Cerro Tololo Obs. ||  || align=right | 2.2 km || 
|-id=490 bgcolor=#d6d6d6
| 618490 ||  || — || August 19, 2001 || Cerro Tololo || Cerro Tololo Obs. ||  || align=right | 2.3 km || 
|-id=491 bgcolor=#d6d6d6
| 618491 ||  || — || June 8, 2016 || Haleakala || Pan-STARRS ||  || align=right | 2.1 km || 
|-id=492 bgcolor=#d6d6d6
| 618492 ||  || — || August 24, 2001 || Kitt Peak || Spacewatch ||  || align=right | 1.8 km || 
|-id=493 bgcolor=#fefefe
| 618493 ||  || — || August 27, 2001 || Kitt Peak || Spacewatch ||  || align=right data-sort-value="0.44" | 440 m || 
|-id=494 bgcolor=#E9E9E9
| 618494 ||  || — || November 22, 2014 || Haleakala || Pan-STARRS ||  || align=right data-sort-value="0.77" | 770 m || 
|-id=495 bgcolor=#d6d6d6
| 618495 ||  || — || February 19, 2014 || Kitt Peak || Spacewatch ||  || align=right | 2.4 km || 
|-id=496 bgcolor=#E9E9E9
| 618496 ||  || — || September 20, 2001 || Socorro || LINEAR ||  || align=right | 1.1 km || 
|-id=497 bgcolor=#E9E9E9
| 618497 ||  || — || September 20, 2001 || Socorro || LINEAR ||  || align=right data-sort-value="0.87" | 870 m || 
|-id=498 bgcolor=#E9E9E9
| 618498 ||  || — || September 20, 2001 || Socorro || LINEAR ||  || align=right | 1.1 km || 
|-id=499 bgcolor=#E9E9E9
| 618499 ||  || — || September 19, 2001 || Socorro || LINEAR ||  || align=right | 1.2 km || 
|-id=500 bgcolor=#E9E9E9
| 618500 ||  || — || September 19, 2001 || Socorro || LINEAR ||  || align=right | 1.1 km || 
|}

618501–618600 

|-bgcolor=#E9E9E9
| 618501 ||  || — || September 21, 2001 || Kitt Peak || Spacewatch ||  || align=right data-sort-value="0.77" | 770 m || 
|-id=502 bgcolor=#E9E9E9
| 618502 ||  || — || September 20, 2001 || Socorro || LINEAR ||  || align=right data-sort-value="0.81" | 810 m || 
|-id=503 bgcolor=#E9E9E9
| 618503 ||  || — || September 20, 2001 || Socorro || LINEAR ||  || align=right | 1.1 km || 
|-id=504 bgcolor=#d6d6d6
| 618504 ||  || — || September 22, 2001 || Socorro || LINEAR ||  || align=right | 3.0 km || 
|-id=505 bgcolor=#E9E9E9
| 618505 ||  || — || September 19, 2001 || Socorro || LINEAR ||  || align=right | 1.2 km || 
|-id=506 bgcolor=#d6d6d6
| 618506 ||  || — || September 18, 2001 || Apache Point || SDSS Collaboration ||  || align=right | 2.3 km || 
|-id=507 bgcolor=#fefefe
| 618507 ||  || — || October 9, 2008 || Kitt Peak || Spacewatch ||  || align=right data-sort-value="0.95" | 950 m || 
|-id=508 bgcolor=#E9E9E9
| 618508 ||  || — || November 7, 2010 || Charleston || R. Holmes ||  || align=right | 1.3 km || 
|-id=509 bgcolor=#E9E9E9
| 618509 ||  || — || November 22, 2014 || Haleakala || Pan-STARRS ||  || align=right data-sort-value="0.81" | 810 m || 
|-id=510 bgcolor=#E9E9E9
| 618510 ||  || — || December 25, 2010 || Mount Lemmon || Mount Lemmon Survey ||  || align=right | 1.0 km || 
|-id=511 bgcolor=#d6d6d6
| 618511 ||  || — || October 14, 2001 || Socorro || LINEAR ||  || align=right | 2.9 km || 
|-id=512 bgcolor=#E9E9E9
| 618512 ||  || — || October 10, 2001 || Palomar || NEAT ||  || align=right | 1.4 km || 
|-id=513 bgcolor=#E9E9E9
| 618513 ||  || — || October 10, 2001 || Palomar || NEAT ||  || align=right | 1.3 km || 
|-id=514 bgcolor=#fefefe
| 618514 ||  || — || October 15, 2001 || Socorro || LINEAR ||  || align=right | 1.1 km || 
|-id=515 bgcolor=#E9E9E9
| 618515 ||  || — || September 28, 2001 || Palomar || NEAT ||  || align=right | 1.1 km || 
|-id=516 bgcolor=#E9E9E9
| 618516 ||  || — || October 14, 2001 || Socorro || LINEAR ||  || align=right | 1.3 km || 
|-id=517 bgcolor=#d6d6d6
| 618517 ||  || — || October 14, 2001 || Socorro || LINEAR ||  || align=right | 2.6 km || 
|-id=518 bgcolor=#E9E9E9
| 618518 ||  || — || October 14, 2001 || Socorro || LINEAR ||  || align=right | 1.3 km || 
|-id=519 bgcolor=#fefefe
| 618519 ||  || — || October 11, 2001 || Palomar || NEAT ||  || align=right data-sort-value="0.66" | 660 m || 
|-id=520 bgcolor=#E9E9E9
| 618520 ||  || — || October 14, 2001 || Apache Point || SDSS Collaboration ||  || align=right | 1.2 km || 
|-id=521 bgcolor=#fefefe
| 618521 ||  || — || November 20, 2008 || Kitt Peak || Spacewatch ||  || align=right data-sort-value="0.52" | 520 m || 
|-id=522 bgcolor=#d6d6d6
| 618522 ||  || — || February 10, 2014 || Haleakala || Pan-STARRS ||  || align=right | 3.1 km || 
|-id=523 bgcolor=#d6d6d6
| 618523 ||  || — || February 22, 2009 || Kitt Peak || Spacewatch ||  || align=right | 2.9 km || 
|-id=524 bgcolor=#d6d6d6
| 618524 ||  || — || November 5, 2007 || Mount Lemmon || Mount Lemmon Survey ||  || align=right | 2.6 km || 
|-id=525 bgcolor=#d6d6d6
| 618525 ||  || — || March 17, 2015 || Haleakala || Pan-STARRS ||  || align=right | 2.2 km || 
|-id=526 bgcolor=#E9E9E9
| 618526 ||  || — || October 14, 2001 || Apache Point || SDSS Collaboration ||  || align=right | 1.4 km || 
|-id=527 bgcolor=#d6d6d6
| 618527 ||  || — || July 30, 2017 || Haleakala || Pan-STARRS ||  || align=right | 2.5 km || 
|-id=528 bgcolor=#fefefe
| 618528 ||  || — || October 13, 2001 || Kitt Peak || Spacewatch ||  || align=right data-sort-value="0.64" | 640 m || 
|-id=529 bgcolor=#fefefe
| 618529 ||  || — || July 24, 2015 || Haleakala || Pan-STARRS ||  || align=right data-sort-value="0.66" | 660 m || 
|-id=530 bgcolor=#C2FFFF
| 618530 ||  || — || January 12, 2015 || Haleakala || Pan-STARRS || Tj (2.79) || align=right | 6.4 km || 
|-id=531 bgcolor=#E9E9E9
| 618531 ||  || — || October 15, 2001 || Palomar || NEAT ||  || align=right data-sort-value="0.99" | 990 m || 
|-id=532 bgcolor=#d6d6d6
| 618532 ||  || — || October 10, 2001 || Kitt Peak || Spacewatch ||  || align=right | 2.4 km || 
|-id=533 bgcolor=#d6d6d6
| 618533 ||  || — || October 14, 2001 || Apache Point || SDSS Collaboration ||  || align=right | 1.9 km || 
|-id=534 bgcolor=#E9E9E9
| 618534 ||  || — || October 14, 2001 || Kitt Peak || Spacewatch ||  || align=right data-sort-value="0.82" | 820 m || 
|-id=535 bgcolor=#E9E9E9
| 618535 ||  || — || October 18, 2001 || Socorro || LINEAR ||  || align=right | 1.6 km || 
|-id=536 bgcolor=#d6d6d6
| 618536 ||  || — || October 11, 2001 || Kitt Peak || Spacewatch ||  || align=right | 2.6 km || 
|-id=537 bgcolor=#E9E9E9
| 618537 ||  || — || October 17, 2001 || Socorro || LINEAR ||  || align=right data-sort-value="0.87" | 870 m || 
|-id=538 bgcolor=#C2FFFF
| 618538 ||  || — || October 23, 2001 || Socorro || LINEAR || Tj (2.83) || align=right | 8.8 km || 
|-id=539 bgcolor=#d6d6d6
| 618539 ||  || — || October 25, 2001 || Kitt Peak || Spacewatch ||  || align=right | 1.5 km || 
|-id=540 bgcolor=#E9E9E9
| 618540 ||  || — || October 15, 2001 || Kitt Peak || Spacewatch ||  || align=right data-sort-value="0.88" | 880 m || 
|-id=541 bgcolor=#E9E9E9
| 618541 ||  || — || October 21, 2001 || Socorro || LINEAR ||  || align=right | 1.3 km || 
|-id=542 bgcolor=#d6d6d6
| 618542 ||  || — || October 21, 2001 || Socorro || LINEAR ||  || align=right | 3.5 km || 
|-id=543 bgcolor=#d6d6d6
| 618543 ||  || — || February 1, 2003 || Palomar || NEAT ||  || align=right | 3.2 km || 
|-id=544 bgcolor=#d6d6d6
| 618544 ||  || — || November 9, 2013 || Haleakala || Pan-STARRS ||  || align=right | 3.3 km || 
|-id=545 bgcolor=#d6d6d6
| 618545 ||  || — || October 21, 2001 || Kitt Peak || Spacewatch ||  || align=right | 2.6 km || 
|-id=546 bgcolor=#d6d6d6
| 618546 ||  || — || July 30, 2017 || Haleakala || Pan-STARRS ||  || align=right | 2.4 km || 
|-id=547 bgcolor=#E9E9E9
| 618547 ||  || — || October 17, 2001 || Kitt Peak || Spacewatch ||  || align=right | 1.5 km || 
|-id=548 bgcolor=#C2FFFF
| 618548 ||  || — || October 3, 2013 || Haleakala || Pan-STARRS || Tj (2.92) || align=right | 7.7 km || 
|-id=549 bgcolor=#E9E9E9
| 618549 ||  || — || October 23, 2001 || Palomar || NEAT ||  || align=right | 1.4 km || 
|-id=550 bgcolor=#d6d6d6
| 618550 ||  || — || November 17, 2001 || Kitt Peak || Spacewatch ||  || align=right | 2.1 km || 
|-id=551 bgcolor=#d6d6d6
| 618551 ||  || — || November 17, 2001 || Socorro || LINEAR ||  || align=right | 2.7 km || 
|-id=552 bgcolor=#d6d6d6
| 618552 ||  || — || November 19, 2001 || Socorro || LINEAR ||  || align=right | 3.0 km || 
|-id=553 bgcolor=#d6d6d6
| 618553 ||  || — || November 20, 2001 || Socorro || LINEAR ||  || align=right | 2.5 km || 
|-id=554 bgcolor=#d6d6d6
| 618554 ||  || — || November 20, 2001 || Socorro || LINEAR ||  || align=right | 2.2 km || 
|-id=555 bgcolor=#d6d6d6
| 618555 ||  || — || June 15, 2015 || Haleakala || Pan-STARRS ||  || align=right | 3.1 km || 
|-id=556 bgcolor=#d6d6d6
| 618556 ||  || — || January 5, 2013 || Kitt Peak || Spacewatch ||  || align=right | 2.0 km || 
|-id=557 bgcolor=#FA8072
| 618557 ||  || — || November 17, 2001 || Socorro || LINEAR ||  || align=right data-sort-value="0.99" | 990 m || 
|-id=558 bgcolor=#fefefe
| 618558 ||  || — || November 18, 2001 || Socorro || LINEAR || H || align=right data-sort-value="0.62" | 620 m || 
|-id=559 bgcolor=#E9E9E9
| 618559 ||  || — || December 15, 2001 || Socorro || LINEAR ||  || align=right | 1.2 km || 
|-id=560 bgcolor=#E9E9E9
| 618560 ||  || — || January 6, 2002 || Haleakala || AMOS ||  || align=right | 1.1 km || 
|-id=561 bgcolor=#E9E9E9
| 618561 ||  || — || December 17, 2001 || Socorro || LINEAR ||  || align=right | 1.4 km || 
|-id=562 bgcolor=#E9E9E9
| 618562 ||  || — || December 18, 2001 || Socorro || LINEAR ||  || align=right | 1.4 km || 
|-id=563 bgcolor=#fefefe
| 618563 ||  || — || December 18, 2001 || Socorro || LINEAR ||  || align=right data-sort-value="0.62" | 620 m || 
|-id=564 bgcolor=#d6d6d6
| 618564 ||  || — || December 18, 2001 || Socorro || LINEAR ||  || align=right | 2.6 km || 
|-id=565 bgcolor=#fefefe
| 618565 ||  || — || December 19, 2001 || Palomar || NEAT ||  || align=right data-sort-value="0.75" | 750 m || 
|-id=566 bgcolor=#d6d6d6
| 618566 ||  || — || April 24, 2003 || Kitt Peak || Spacewatch ||  || align=right | 3.0 km || 
|-id=567 bgcolor=#d6d6d6
| 618567 ||  || — || August 7, 2016 || Haleakala || Pan-STARRS ||  || align=right | 2.3 km || 
|-id=568 bgcolor=#d6d6d6
| 618568 ||  || — || February 12, 2008 || Mount Lemmon || Mount Lemmon Survey ||  || align=right | 2.3 km || 
|-id=569 bgcolor=#E9E9E9
| 618569 ||  || — || July 14, 2013 || Haleakala || Pan-STARRS ||  || align=right | 1.3 km || 
|-id=570 bgcolor=#d6d6d6
| 618570 ||  || — || September 4, 2011 || Haleakala || Pan-STARRS ||  || align=right | 2.5 km || 
|-id=571 bgcolor=#d6d6d6
| 618571 ||  || — || December 20, 2001 || Kitt Peak || Spacewatch ||  || align=right | 2.2 km || 
|-id=572 bgcolor=#d6d6d6
| 618572 ||  || — || January 12, 2002 || Kitt Peak || Spacewatch ||  || align=right | 2.8 km || 
|-id=573 bgcolor=#d6d6d6
| 618573 ||  || — || January 13, 2002 || Kitt Peak || Spacewatch ||  || align=right | 2.4 km || 
|-id=574 bgcolor=#E9E9E9
| 618574 ||  || — || January 12, 2002 || Palomar || NEAT ||  || align=right | 2.7 km || 
|-id=575 bgcolor=#E9E9E9
| 618575 ||  || — || January 9, 2002 || Apache Point || SDSS Collaboration ||  || align=right | 1.2 km || 
|-id=576 bgcolor=#E9E9E9
| 618576 ||  || — || March 13, 2007 || Mount Lemmon || Mount Lemmon Survey ||  || align=right | 1.1 km || 
|-id=577 bgcolor=#fefefe
| 618577 ||  || — || February 6, 2013 || Kitt Peak || Spacewatch ||  || align=right data-sort-value="0.66" | 660 m || 
|-id=578 bgcolor=#d6d6d6
| 618578 ||  || — || August 1, 2016 || Haleakala || Pan-STARRS ||  || align=right | 2.2 km || 
|-id=579 bgcolor=#fefefe
| 618579 ||  || — || February 25, 2006 || Kitt Peak || Spacewatch ||  || align=right data-sort-value="0.58" | 580 m || 
|-id=580 bgcolor=#E9E9E9
| 618580 ||  || — || November 1, 2005 || Mount Lemmon || Mount Lemmon Survey ||  || align=right | 1.3 km || 
|-id=581 bgcolor=#d6d6d6
| 618581 ||  || — || December 20, 2001 || Apache Point || SDSS Collaboration ||  || align=right | 2.9 km || 
|-id=582 bgcolor=#d6d6d6
| 618582 ||  || — || February 28, 2008 || Mount Lemmon || Mount Lemmon Survey ||  || align=right | 2.5 km || 
|-id=583 bgcolor=#d6d6d6
| 618583 ||  || — || February 10, 2008 || Mount Lemmon || Mount Lemmon Survey ||  || align=right | 2.1 km || 
|-id=584 bgcolor=#E9E9E9
| 618584 ||  || — || February 7, 2002 || Socorro || LINEAR ||  || align=right | 1.4 km || 
|-id=585 bgcolor=#E9E9E9
| 618585 ||  || — || January 13, 2002 || Bergisch Gladbach || W. Bickel ||  || align=right | 1.3 km || 
|-id=586 bgcolor=#fefefe
| 618586 ||  || — || February 10, 2002 || Socorro || LINEAR ||  || align=right data-sort-value="0.79" | 790 m || 
|-id=587 bgcolor=#E9E9E9
| 618587 ||  || — || January 14, 2002 || Palomar || NEAT ||  || align=right | 1.7 km || 
|-id=588 bgcolor=#d6d6d6
| 618588 ||  || — || February 7, 2002 || Socorro || LINEAR ||  || align=right | 2.8 km || 
|-id=589 bgcolor=#d6d6d6
| 618589 ||  || — || February 9, 2002 || Kitt Peak || Spacewatch ||  || align=right | 3.1 km || 
|-id=590 bgcolor=#fefefe
| 618590 ||  || — || February 7, 2002 || Palomar || NEAT ||  || align=right data-sort-value="0.77" | 770 m || 
|-id=591 bgcolor=#fefefe
| 618591 ||  || — || February 8, 2002 || Kitt Peak || Spacewatch ||  || align=right data-sort-value="0.73" | 730 m || 
|-id=592 bgcolor=#E9E9E9
| 618592 ||  || — || March 16, 2007 || Kitt Peak || Spacewatch ||  || align=right | 2.1 km || 
|-id=593 bgcolor=#d6d6d6
| 618593 ||  || — || October 29, 2006 || Catalina || CSS ||  || align=right | 2.9 km || 
|-id=594 bgcolor=#E9E9E9
| 618594 ||  || — || February 8, 2002 || Kitt Peak || Spacewatch ||  || align=right | 1.6 km || 
|-id=595 bgcolor=#d6d6d6
| 618595 ||  || — || September 4, 2011 || Haleakala || Pan-STARRS ||  || align=right | 2.2 km || 
|-id=596 bgcolor=#d6d6d6
| 618596 ||  || — || July 5, 2016 || Haleakala || Pan-STARRS ||  || align=right | 2.7 km || 
|-id=597 bgcolor=#d6d6d6
| 618597 ||  || — || February 13, 2002 || Apache Point || SDSS Collaboration ||  || align=right | 2.1 km || 
|-id=598 bgcolor=#fefefe
| 618598 ||  || — || April 15, 2012 || Haleakala || Pan-STARRS ||  || align=right data-sort-value="0.58" | 580 m || 
|-id=599 bgcolor=#d6d6d6
| 618599 ||  || — || September 30, 2017 || Haleakala || Pan-STARRS ||  || align=right | 2.4 km || 
|-id=600 bgcolor=#E9E9E9
| 618600 ||  || — || January 29, 2011 || Kitt Peak || Spacewatch ||  || align=right | 1.9 km || 
|}

618601–618700 

|-bgcolor=#fefefe
| 618601 ||  || — || February 12, 2002 || Kitt Peak || Spacewatch ||  || align=right data-sort-value="0.58" | 580 m || 
|-id=602 bgcolor=#d6d6d6
| 618602 ||  || — || May 29, 2009 || Kitt Peak || Spacewatch ||  || align=right | 3.2 km || 
|-id=603 bgcolor=#d6d6d6
| 618603 ||  || — || April 21, 2012 || Mount Lemmon || Mount Lemmon Survey ||  || align=right | 1.8 km || 
|-id=604 bgcolor=#E9E9E9
| 618604 ||  || — || March 5, 2002 || Kitt Peak || Spacewatch ||  || align=right | 1.7 km || 
|-id=605 bgcolor=#fefefe
| 618605 ||  || — || March 9, 2002 || Kitt Peak || Spacewatch ||  || align=right data-sort-value="0.54" | 540 m || 
|-id=606 bgcolor=#fefefe
| 618606 ||  || — || February 11, 2002 || Socorro || LINEAR ||  || align=right data-sort-value="0.79" | 790 m || 
|-id=607 bgcolor=#fefefe
| 618607 ||  || — || March 15, 2002 || Kitt Peak || Spacewatch || H || align=right data-sort-value="0.69" | 690 m || 
|-id=608 bgcolor=#fefefe
| 618608 ||  || — || March 10, 2002 || Cima Ekar || Asiago Obs. ||  || align=right data-sort-value="0.45" | 450 m || 
|-id=609 bgcolor=#d6d6d6
| 618609 ||  || — || April 4, 2008 || Mount Lemmon || Mount Lemmon Survey ||  || align=right | 3.3 km || 
|-id=610 bgcolor=#d6d6d6
| 618610 ||  || — || August 14, 2004 || Cerro Tololo || Cerro Tololo Obs. ||  || align=right | 3.2 km || 
|-id=611 bgcolor=#fefefe
| 618611 ||  || — || February 9, 2002 || Kitt Peak || Spacewatch ||  || align=right data-sort-value="0.85" | 850 m || 
|-id=612 bgcolor=#fefefe
| 618612 ||  || — || April 9, 2006 || Kitt Peak || Spacewatch ||  || align=right data-sort-value="0.63" | 630 m || 
|-id=613 bgcolor=#E9E9E9
| 618613 ||  || — || April 28, 2012 || Mount Lemmon || Mount Lemmon Survey ||  || align=right | 2.0 km || 
|-id=614 bgcolor=#d6d6d6
| 618614 ||  || — || January 15, 2013 || Nogales || M. Schwartz, P. R. Holvorcem ||  || align=right | 2.2 km || 
|-id=615 bgcolor=#d6d6d6
| 618615 ||  || — || March 13, 2008 || Kitt Peak || Spacewatch ||  || align=right | 2.5 km || 
|-id=616 bgcolor=#fefefe
| 618616 ||  || — || December 22, 2008 || Kitt Peak || Spacewatch ||  || align=right data-sort-value="0.50" | 500 m || 
|-id=617 bgcolor=#E9E9E9
| 618617 ||  || — || April 7, 2002 || Cerro Tololo || Cerro Tololo Obs. ||  || align=right | 1.9 km || 
|-id=618 bgcolor=#E9E9E9
| 618618 ||  || — || April 2, 2002 || Palomar || NEAT ||  || align=right | 2.2 km || 
|-id=619 bgcolor=#E9E9E9
| 618619 ||  || — || October 17, 2008 || Kitt Peak || Spacewatch ||  || align=right | 2.5 km || 
|-id=620 bgcolor=#E9E9E9
| 618620 ||  || — || October 9, 2004 || Kitt Peak || Spacewatch ||  || align=right | 3.4 km || 
|-id=621 bgcolor=#fefefe
| 618621 ||  || — || October 15, 2009 || Kitt Peak || Spacewatch ||  || align=right data-sort-value="0.65" | 650 m || 
|-id=622 bgcolor=#d6d6d6
| 618622 ||  || — || June 7, 2002 || Palomar || NEAT ||  || align=right | 2.1 km || 
|-id=623 bgcolor=#E9E9E9
| 618623 ||  || — || October 26, 2008 || Mount Lemmon || Mount Lemmon Survey ||  || align=right | 2.5 km || 
|-id=624 bgcolor=#fefefe
| 618624 ||  || — || August 5, 2002 || Palomar || NEAT ||  || align=right data-sort-value="0.52" | 520 m || 
|-id=625 bgcolor=#FA8072
| 618625 ||  || — || July 9, 2002 || Socorro || LINEAR ||  || align=right | 1.4 km || 
|-id=626 bgcolor=#fefefe
| 618626 ||  || — || August 8, 2002 || Palomar || NEAT ||  || align=right data-sort-value="0.73" | 730 m || 
|-id=627 bgcolor=#E9E9E9
| 618627 ||  || — || September 16, 2006 || Kitt Peak || Spacewatch ||  || align=right data-sort-value="0.79" | 790 m || 
|-id=628 bgcolor=#E9E9E9
| 618628 ||  || — || June 18, 2010 || Mount Lemmon || Mount Lemmon Survey ||  || align=right data-sort-value="0.97" | 970 m || 
|-id=629 bgcolor=#E9E9E9
| 618629 ||  || — || August 8, 2002 || Palomar || NEAT ||  || align=right | 1.2 km || 
|-id=630 bgcolor=#E9E9E9
| 618630 ||  || — || September 3, 2002 || Haleakala || AMOS ||  || align=right data-sort-value="0.84" | 840 m || 
|-id=631 bgcolor=#E9E9E9
| 618631 ||  || — || September 3, 2002 || Haleakala || AMOS ||  || align=right data-sort-value="0.90" | 900 m || 
|-id=632 bgcolor=#d6d6d6
| 618632 ||  || — || August 8, 2002 || Palomar || NEAT ||  || align=right | 2.4 km || 
|-id=633 bgcolor=#d6d6d6
| 618633 ||  || — || August 19, 2002 || Palomar || NEAT ||  || align=right | 3.1 km || 
|-id=634 bgcolor=#d6d6d6
| 618634 ||  || — || August 26, 2002 || Palomar || NEAT ||  || align=right | 2.5 km || 
|-id=635 bgcolor=#E9E9E9
| 618635 ||  || — || June 6, 2005 || Kitt Peak || D. E. Trilling ||  || align=right | 1.4 km || 
|-id=636 bgcolor=#d6d6d6
| 618636 ||  || — || April 2, 2011 || Mount Lemmon || Mount Lemmon Survey ||  || align=right | 1.9 km || 
|-id=637 bgcolor=#fefefe
| 618637 ||  || — || October 18, 2009 || Mount Lemmon || Mount Lemmon Survey ||  || align=right data-sort-value="0.58" | 580 m || 
|-id=638 bgcolor=#E9E9E9
| 618638 ||  || — || August 30, 2006 || Anderson Mesa || LONEOS ||  || align=right data-sort-value="0.68" | 680 m || 
|-id=639 bgcolor=#d6d6d6
| 618639 ||  || — || March 24, 2015 || Mount Lemmon || Mount Lemmon Survey ||  || align=right | 2.0 km || 
|-id=640 bgcolor=#fefefe
| 618640 ||  || — || September 11, 2002 || Palomar || NEAT ||  || align=right data-sort-value="0.93" | 930 m || 
|-id=641 bgcolor=#fefefe
| 618641 ||  || — || September 12, 2002 || Palomar || NEAT ||  || align=right data-sort-value="0.89" | 890 m || 
|-id=642 bgcolor=#d6d6d6
| 618642 ||  || — || September 12, 2002 || Palomar || NEAT ||  || align=right | 3.7 km || 
|-id=643 bgcolor=#E9E9E9
| 618643 ||  || — || September 12, 1994 || Kitt Peak || Spacewatch ||  || align=right data-sort-value="0.73" | 730 m || 
|-id=644 bgcolor=#d6d6d6
| 618644 ||  || — || February 9, 2005 || Kitt Peak || Spacewatch ||  || align=right | 2.9 km || 
|-id=645 bgcolor=#d6d6d6
| 618645 ||  || — || August 18, 2002 || Palomar || NEAT ||  || align=right | 1.7 km || 
|-id=646 bgcolor=#fefefe
| 618646 ||  || — || September 8, 2002 || Haleakala || AMOS ||  || align=right data-sort-value="0.85" | 850 m || 
|-id=647 bgcolor=#d6d6d6
| 618647 ||  || — || December 29, 2008 || Kitt Peak || Spacewatch ||  || align=right | 2.5 km || 
|-id=648 bgcolor=#d6d6d6
| 618648 ||  || — || February 15, 2010 || Mount Lemmon || Mount Lemmon Survey ||  || align=right | 2.4 km || 
|-id=649 bgcolor=#E9E9E9
| 618649 ||  || — || February 26, 2008 || Mount Lemmon || Mount Lemmon Survey ||  || align=right data-sort-value="0.78" | 780 m || 
|-id=650 bgcolor=#fefefe
| 618650 ||  || — || September 27, 2002 || Palomar || NEAT ||  || align=right data-sort-value="0.62" | 620 m || 
|-id=651 bgcolor=#fefefe
| 618651 ||  || — || September 26, 2002 || Palomar || NEAT || H || align=right data-sort-value="0.55" | 550 m || 
|-id=652 bgcolor=#fefefe
| 618652 ||  || — || August 29, 2002 || Palomar || NEAT ||  || align=right data-sort-value="0.66" | 660 m || 
|-id=653 bgcolor=#d6d6d6
| 618653 ||  || — || October 30, 2002 || Apache Point || SDSS Collaboration ||  || align=right | 2.7 km || 
|-id=654 bgcolor=#E9E9E9
| 618654 ||  || — || October 4, 2002 || Socorro || LINEAR ||  || align=right data-sort-value="0.88" | 880 m || 
|-id=655 bgcolor=#fefefe
| 618655 ||  || — || October 4, 2002 || Palomar || NEAT ||  || align=right data-sort-value="0.53" | 530 m || 
|-id=656 bgcolor=#fefefe
| 618656 ||  || — || October 5, 2002 || Palomar || NEAT ||  || align=right data-sort-value="0.49" | 490 m || 
|-id=657 bgcolor=#E9E9E9
| 618657 ||  || — || September 28, 2002 || Palomar || NEAT ||  || align=right | 1.8 km || 
|-id=658 bgcolor=#E9E9E9
| 618658 ||  || — || September 25, 2006 || Mount Lemmon || Mount Lemmon Survey ||  || align=right data-sort-value="0.65" | 650 m || 
|-id=659 bgcolor=#d6d6d6
| 618659 ||  || — || October 10, 2012 || Haleakala || Pan-STARRS ||  || align=right | 3.1 km || 
|-id=660 bgcolor=#d6d6d6
| 618660 ||  || — || November 25, 2002 || Palomar || NEAT ||  || align=right | 1.9 km || 
|-id=661 bgcolor=#fefefe
| 618661 ||  || — || October 9, 2002 || Kitt Peak || Spacewatch ||  || align=right data-sort-value="0.87" | 870 m || 
|-id=662 bgcolor=#E9E9E9
| 618662 ||  || — || August 27, 2006 || Kitt Peak || Spacewatch ||  || align=right data-sort-value="0.67" | 670 m || 
|-id=663 bgcolor=#E9E9E9
| 618663 ||  || — || October 9, 2002 || Anderson Mesa || LONEOS ||  || align=right data-sort-value="0.70" | 700 m || 
|-id=664 bgcolor=#E9E9E9
| 618664 ||  || — || November 16, 2006 || Mount Lemmon || Mount Lemmon Survey ||  || align=right data-sort-value="0.77" | 770 m || 
|-id=665 bgcolor=#FA8072
| 618665 ||  || — || October 19, 2007 || Catalina || CSS || H || align=right data-sort-value="0.46" | 460 m || 
|-id=666 bgcolor=#d6d6d6
| 618666 ||  || — || September 18, 2007 || Catalina || CSS ||  || align=right | 3.1 km || 
|-id=667 bgcolor=#d6d6d6
| 618667 ||  || — || November 2, 2007 || Mount Lemmon || Mount Lemmon Survey ||  || align=right | 2.4 km || 
|-id=668 bgcolor=#E9E9E9
| 618668 ||  || — || November 4, 2002 || Palomar || NEAT ||  || align=right data-sort-value="0.80" | 800 m || 
|-id=669 bgcolor=#fefefe
| 618669 ||  || — || November 6, 2002 || Haleakala || AMOS ||  || align=right data-sort-value="0.67" | 670 m || 
|-id=670 bgcolor=#E9E9E9
| 618670 ||  || — || October 2, 2006 || Mount Lemmon || Mount Lemmon Survey ||  || align=right | 1.6 km || 
|-id=671 bgcolor=#E9E9E9
| 618671 ||  || — || March 8, 2008 || Mount Lemmon || Mount Lemmon Survey ||  || align=right | 1.1 km || 
|-id=672 bgcolor=#d6d6d6
| 618672 ||  || — || November 16, 2002 || Palomar || NEAT ||  || align=right | 2.4 km || 
|-id=673 bgcolor=#d6d6d6
| 618673 ||  || — || November 4, 2007 || Mount Lemmon || Mount Lemmon Survey ||  || align=right | 2.3 km || 
|-id=674 bgcolor=#d6d6d6
| 618674 ||  || — || November 7, 2002 || Kitt Peak || Kitt Peak Obs. ||  || align=right | 3.1 km || 
|-id=675 bgcolor=#fefefe
| 618675 ||  || — || October 22, 1995 || Kitt Peak || Spacewatch ||  || align=right data-sort-value="0.68" | 680 m || 
|-id=676 bgcolor=#d6d6d6
| 618676 ||  || — || December 22, 2008 || Kitt Peak || Spacewatch ||  || align=right | 2.0 km || 
|-id=677 bgcolor=#fefefe
| 618677 ||  || — || January 3, 2013 || Mount Lemmon || Mount Lemmon Survey ||  || align=right data-sort-value="0.47" | 470 m || 
|-id=678 bgcolor=#d6d6d6
| 618678 ||  || — || December 28, 2013 || Kitt Peak || Spacewatch ||  || align=right | 2.3 km || 
|-id=679 bgcolor=#d6d6d6
| 618679 ||  || — || January 27, 2003 || Haleakala || AMOS ||  || align=right | 4.2 km || 
|-id=680 bgcolor=#E9E9E9
| 618680 ||  || — || February 9, 2003 || Haleakala || AMOS ||  || align=right | 1.8 km || 
|-id=681 bgcolor=#E9E9E9
| 618681 ||  || — || January 19, 2012 || Oukaimeden ||  ||  || align=right | 1.9 km || 
|-id=682 bgcolor=#d6d6d6
| 618682 ||  || — || August 31, 2011 || Haleakala || Pan-STARRS ||  || align=right | 2.3 km || 
|-id=683 bgcolor=#d6d6d6
| 618683 ||  || — || December 3, 2007 || Kitt Peak || Spacewatch ||  || align=right | 2.7 km || 
|-id=684 bgcolor=#E9E9E9
| 618684 ||  || — || March 16, 2012 || Haleakala || Pan-STARRS ||  || align=right | 1.7 km || 
|-id=685 bgcolor=#E9E9E9
| 618685 ||  || — || September 16, 2010 || Mount Lemmon || Mount Lemmon Survey ||  || align=right data-sort-value="0.99" | 990 m || 
|-id=686 bgcolor=#d6d6d6
| 618686 ||  || — || April 23, 2015 || Haleakala || Pan-STARRS ||  || align=right | 2.3 km || 
|-id=687 bgcolor=#d6d6d6
| 618687 ||  || — || February 26, 2014 || Mount Lemmon || Mount Lemmon Survey ||  || align=right | 2.1 km || 
|-id=688 bgcolor=#E9E9E9
| 618688 ||  || — || January 12, 2016 || Haleakala || Pan-STARRS ||  || align=right | 1.4 km || 
|-id=689 bgcolor=#fefefe
| 618689 ||  || — || January 29, 2003 || Kitt Peak || Spacewatch ||  || align=right data-sort-value="0.49" | 490 m || 
|-id=690 bgcolor=#d6d6d6
| 618690 ||  || — || February 4, 2003 || Socorro || LINEAR ||  || align=right | 3.3 km || 
|-id=691 bgcolor=#d6d6d6
| 618691 ||  || — || May 23, 2004 || Apache Point || SDSS Collaboration ||  || align=right | 3.7 km || 
|-id=692 bgcolor=#FA8072
| 618692 ||  || — || February 2, 2003 || Palomar || NEAT ||  || align=right data-sort-value="0.77" | 770 m || 
|-id=693 bgcolor=#d6d6d6
| 618693 ||  || — || February 9, 2003 || Palomar || NEAT ||  || align=right | 2.6 km || 
|-id=694 bgcolor=#E9E9E9
| 618694 ||  || — || January 23, 2012 || Mayhill || N. Falla ||  || align=right | 2.4 km || 
|-id=695 bgcolor=#d6d6d6
| 618695 ||  || — || May 21, 2015 || Haleakala || Pan-STARRS ||  || align=right | 2.6 km || 
|-id=696 bgcolor=#E9E9E9
| 618696 ||  || — || February 6, 2003 || Kitt Peak || Spacewatch ||  || align=right | 1.7 km || 
|-id=697 bgcolor=#E9E9E9
| 618697 ||  || — || February 26, 2003 || Socorro || LINEAR ||  || align=right | 1.8 km || 
|-id=698 bgcolor=#E9E9E9
| 618698 ||  || — || February 23, 2003 || Campo Imperatore || CINEOS ||  || align=right | 1.3 km || 
|-id=699 bgcolor=#E9E9E9
| 618699 ||  || — || February 12, 2003 || Haleakala || AMOS ||  || align=right | 1.7 km || 
|-id=700 bgcolor=#E9E9E9
| 618700 ||  || — || March 7, 2003 || Kitt Peak || Spacewatch ||  || align=right | 1.6 km || 
|}

618701–618800 

|-bgcolor=#fefefe
| 618701 ||  || — || March 11, 2003 || Palomar || NEAT ||  || align=right data-sort-value="0.80" | 800 m || 
|-id=702 bgcolor=#d6d6d6
| 618702 ||  || — || October 20, 2012 || Haleakala || Pan-STARRS ||  || align=right | 3.1 km || 
|-id=703 bgcolor=#fefefe
| 618703 ||  || — || March 6, 2003 || Anderson Mesa || LONEOS || H || align=right data-sort-value="0.64" | 640 m || 
|-id=704 bgcolor=#d6d6d6
| 618704 ||  || — || March 23, 2003 || Kitt Peak || Spacewatch ||  || align=right | 2.6 km || 
|-id=705 bgcolor=#fefefe
| 618705 ||  || — || March 29, 2003 || Anderson Mesa || LONEOS || H || align=right data-sort-value="0.56" | 560 m || 
|-id=706 bgcolor=#d6d6d6
| 618706 ||  || — || March 28, 2014 || Mount Lemmon || Mount Lemmon Survey ||  || align=right | 2.6 km || 
|-id=707 bgcolor=#d6d6d6
| 618707 ||  || — || April 25, 2015 || Haleakala || Pan-STARRS ||  || align=right | 2.6 km || 
|-id=708 bgcolor=#E9E9E9
| 618708 ||  || — || March 23, 2003 || Apache Point || SDSS Collaboration ||  || align=right | 1.4 km || 
|-id=709 bgcolor=#d6d6d6
| 618709 ||  || — || March 22, 2015 || Haleakala || Pan-STARRS ||  || align=right | 2.8 km || 
|-id=710 bgcolor=#E9E9E9
| 618710 ||  || — || January 27, 2007 || Mount Lemmon || Mount Lemmon Survey ||  || align=right | 1.3 km || 
|-id=711 bgcolor=#d6d6d6
| 618711 ||  || — || September 17, 2017 || Haleakala || Pan-STARRS ||  || align=right | 2.7 km || 
|-id=712 bgcolor=#E9E9E9
| 618712 ||  || — || February 4, 2016 || Haleakala || Pan-STARRS ||  || align=right | 1.2 km || 
|-id=713 bgcolor=#d6d6d6
| 618713 ||  || — || February 28, 2014 || Haleakala || Pan-STARRS ||  || align=right | 1.9 km || 
|-id=714 bgcolor=#E9E9E9
| 618714 ||  || — || April 1, 2012 || Mount Lemmon || Mount Lemmon Survey ||  || align=right | 1.2 km || 
|-id=715 bgcolor=#fefefe
| 618715 ||  || — || March 12, 2003 || Kitt Peak || Spacewatch ||  || align=right data-sort-value="0.70" | 700 m || 
|-id=716 bgcolor=#d6d6d6
| 618716 ||  || — || April 1, 2003 || Cerro Tololo || Cerro Tololo Obs. ||  || align=right | 2.3 km || 
|-id=717 bgcolor=#d6d6d6
| 618717 ||  || — || February 8, 2008 || Mount Lemmon || Mount Lemmon Survey ||  || align=right | 2.9 km || 
|-id=718 bgcolor=#d6d6d6
| 618718 ||  || — || March 12, 2014 || Mount Lemmon || Mount Lemmon Survey ||  || align=right | 2.7 km || 
|-id=719 bgcolor=#d6d6d6
| 618719 ||  || — || October 12, 2006 || Kitt Peak || Spacewatch ||  || align=right | 3.0 km || 
|-id=720 bgcolor=#d6d6d6
| 618720 ||  || — || February 18, 2014 || Mount Lemmon || Mount Lemmon Survey ||  || align=right | 3.0 km || 
|-id=721 bgcolor=#E9E9E9
| 618721 ||  || — || January 17, 2016 || Haleakala || Pan-STARRS ||  || align=right | 1.5 km || 
|-id=722 bgcolor=#d6d6d6
| 618722 ||  || — || September 28, 2011 || Mount Lemmon || Mount Lemmon Survey ||  || align=right | 2.8 km || 
|-id=723 bgcolor=#d6d6d6
| 618723 ||  || — || June 18, 2015 || Haleakala || Pan-STARRS ||  || align=right | 2.3 km || 
|-id=724 bgcolor=#d6d6d6
| 618724 ||  || — || October 23, 2006 || Mount Lemmon || Mount Lemmon Survey ||  || align=right | 3.5 km || 
|-id=725 bgcolor=#fefefe
| 618725 ||  || — || April 25, 2003 || Kitt Peak || Spacewatch ||  || align=right data-sort-value="0.70" | 700 m || 
|-id=726 bgcolor=#d6d6d6
| 618726 ||  || — || April 25, 2003 || Kitt Peak || Spacewatch ||  || align=right | 2.9 km || 
|-id=727 bgcolor=#fefefe
| 618727 ||  || — || April 24, 2003 || Kitt Peak || Spacewatch || H || align=right data-sort-value="0.41" | 410 m || 
|-id=728 bgcolor=#E9E9E9
| 618728 ||  || — || April 21, 2012 || Mount Lemmon || Mount Lemmon Survey ||  || align=right | 2.1 km || 
|-id=729 bgcolor=#E9E9E9
| 618729 ||  || — || April 28, 2012 || Mount Lemmon || Mount Lemmon Survey ||  || align=right | 1.5 km || 
|-id=730 bgcolor=#d6d6d6
| 618730 ||  || — || September 23, 2011 || Haleakala || Pan-STARRS ||  || align=right | 3.0 km || 
|-id=731 bgcolor=#fefefe
| 618731 ||  || — || June 27, 2011 || Kitt Peak || Spacewatch ||  || align=right data-sort-value="0.66" | 660 m || 
|-id=732 bgcolor=#E9E9E9
| 618732 ||  || — || May 26, 2003 || Kitt Peak || Spacewatch ||  || align=right | 1.4 km || 
|-id=733 bgcolor=#E9E9E9
| 618733 ||  || — || May 29, 2003 || Kitt Peak || Spacewatch ||  || align=right | 2.1 km || 
|-id=734 bgcolor=#fefefe
| 618734 ||  || — || January 10, 2013 || Haleakala || Pan-STARRS || H || align=right data-sort-value="0.50" | 500 m || 
|-id=735 bgcolor=#E9E9E9
| 618735 ||  || — || May 28, 2003 || Kitt Peak || Spacewatch ||  || align=right | 2.3 km || 
|-id=736 bgcolor=#d6d6d6
| 618736 ||  || — || November 10, 2006 || Kitt Peak || Spacewatch || Tj (2.99) || align=right | 2.8 km || 
|-id=737 bgcolor=#fefefe
| 618737 ||  || — || September 19, 2011 || Catalina || CSS ||  || align=right data-sort-value="0.90" | 900 m || 
|-id=738 bgcolor=#E9E9E9
| 618738 ||  || — || October 2, 2013 || Haleakala || Pan-STARRS ||  || align=right | 1.5 km || 
|-id=739 bgcolor=#E9E9E9
| 618739 ||  || — || July 24, 2003 || Palomar || NEAT ||  || align=right | 2.5 km || 
|-id=740 bgcolor=#E9E9E9
| 618740 ||  || — || August 24, 2003 || Cerro Tololo || Cerro Tololo Obs. ||  || align=right | 1.8 km || 
|-id=741 bgcolor=#E9E9E9
| 618741 ||  || — || September 16, 2003 || Kitt Peak || Spacewatch ||  || align=right | 2.4 km || 
|-id=742 bgcolor=#E9E9E9
| 618742 ||  || — || September 20, 2003 || Kitt Peak || Spacewatch ||  || align=right | 2.8 km || 
|-id=743 bgcolor=#E9E9E9
| 618743 ||  || — || August 23, 2003 || Palomar || NEAT ||  || align=right | 2.1 km || 
|-id=744 bgcolor=#E9E9E9
| 618744 ||  || — || September 19, 2003 || Campo Imperatore || A. Boattini, A. Di Paola ||  || align=right | 2.3 km || 
|-id=745 bgcolor=#E9E9E9
| 618745 ||  || — || September 29, 2003 || Junk Bond || D. Healy ||  || align=right | 2.4 km || 
|-id=746 bgcolor=#d6d6d6
| 618746 ||  || — || September 26, 2003 || Apache Point || SDSS Collaboration ||  || align=right | 1.8 km || 
|-id=747 bgcolor=#d6d6d6
| 618747 ||  || — || September 28, 2003 || Kitt Peak || Spacewatch ||  || align=right | 1.9 km || 
|-id=748 bgcolor=#E9E9E9
| 618748 ||  || — || September 27, 2003 || Kitt Peak || Spacewatch ||  || align=right | 2.2 km || 
|-id=749 bgcolor=#E9E9E9
| 618749 ||  || — || January 23, 2006 || Kitt Peak || Spacewatch ||  || align=right | 2.6 km || 
|-id=750 bgcolor=#fefefe
| 618750 ||  || — || September 27, 2003 || Kitt Peak || Spacewatch ||  || align=right data-sort-value="0.50" | 500 m || 
|-id=751 bgcolor=#d6d6d6
| 618751 ||  || — || September 18, 2003 || Kitt Peak || Spacewatch || 7:4 || align=right | 2.9 km || 
|-id=752 bgcolor=#E9E9E9
| 618752 ||  || — || September 17, 2003 || Kitt Peak || Spacewatch ||  || align=right | 1.7 km || 
|-id=753 bgcolor=#fefefe
| 618753 ||  || — || April 15, 2012 || Haleakala || Pan-STARRS ||  || align=right data-sort-value="0.63" | 630 m || 
|-id=754 bgcolor=#E9E9E9
| 618754 ||  || — || September 24, 2008 || Kitt Peak || Spacewatch ||  || align=right | 1.8 km || 
|-id=755 bgcolor=#fefefe
| 618755 ||  || — || September 18, 2003 || Kitt Peak || Spacewatch ||  || align=right data-sort-value="0.66" | 660 m || 
|-id=756 bgcolor=#d6d6d6
| 618756 ||  || — || April 4, 2014 || Mount Lemmon || Mount Lemmon Survey || 7:4 || align=right | 3.1 km || 
|-id=757 bgcolor=#fefefe
| 618757 ||  || — || October 9, 2007 || Mount Lemmon || Mount Lemmon Survey ||  || align=right data-sort-value="0.65" | 650 m || 
|-id=758 bgcolor=#d6d6d6
| 618758 ||  || — || January 14, 2016 || Haleakala || Pan-STARRS ||  || align=right | 2.2 km || 
|-id=759 bgcolor=#d6d6d6
| 618759 ||  || — || September 22, 2003 || Kitt Peak || Spacewatch ||  || align=right | 2.0 km || 
|-id=760 bgcolor=#E9E9E9
| 618760 ||  || — || October 17, 2003 || Kitt Peak || Spacewatch ||  || align=right | 2.0 km || 
|-id=761 bgcolor=#fefefe
| 618761 ||  || — || October 16, 2003 || Kitt Peak || Spacewatch ||  || align=right data-sort-value="0.64" | 640 m || 
|-id=762 bgcolor=#fefefe
| 618762 ||  || — || October 16, 2003 || Palomar || NEAT ||  || align=right data-sort-value="0.61" | 610 m || 
|-id=763 bgcolor=#fefefe
| 618763 ||  || — || October 20, 2003 || Kitt Peak || Spacewatch ||  || align=right data-sort-value="0.62" | 620 m || 
|-id=764 bgcolor=#fefefe
| 618764 ||  || — || October 21, 2003 || Kitt Peak || Spacewatch ||  || align=right data-sort-value="0.71" | 710 m || 
|-id=765 bgcolor=#fefefe
| 618765 ||  || — || October 17, 2003 || Kitt Peak || Spacewatch ||  || align=right data-sort-value="0.60" | 600 m || 
|-id=766 bgcolor=#fefefe
| 618766 ||  || — || October 18, 2003 || Haleakala || AMOS ||  || align=right data-sort-value="0.90" | 900 m || 
|-id=767 bgcolor=#fefefe
| 618767 ||  || — || October 17, 2003 || Kitt Peak || Spacewatch ||  || align=right data-sort-value="0.50" | 500 m || 
|-id=768 bgcolor=#d6d6d6
| 618768 ||  || — || October 16, 2003 || Kitt Peak || Spacewatch ||  || align=right | 2.9 km || 
|-id=769 bgcolor=#fefefe
| 618769 ||  || — || September 16, 2003 || Kitt Peak || Spacewatch ||  || align=right data-sort-value="0.72" | 720 m || 
|-id=770 bgcolor=#E9E9E9
| 618770 ||  || — || October 18, 2003 || Kitt Peak || Spacewatch ||  || align=right | 1.9 km || 
|-id=771 bgcolor=#fefefe
| 618771 ||  || — || October 19, 2003 || Kitt Peak || Spacewatch ||  || align=right data-sort-value="0.86" | 860 m || 
|-id=772 bgcolor=#fefefe
| 618772 ||  || — || October 19, 2003 || Kitt Peak || Spacewatch ||  || align=right data-sort-value="0.57" | 570 m || 
|-id=773 bgcolor=#fefefe
| 618773 ||  || — || October 23, 2003 || Kitt Peak || Spacewatch ||  || align=right data-sort-value="0.65" | 650 m || 
|-id=774 bgcolor=#fefefe
| 618774 ||  || — || October 23, 2003 || Apache Point || SDSS Collaboration ||  || align=right data-sort-value="0.92" | 920 m || 
|-id=775 bgcolor=#d6d6d6
| 618775 ||  || — || October 23, 2003 || Apache Point || SDSS Collaboration ||  || align=right | 2.1 km || 
|-id=776 bgcolor=#d6d6d6
| 618776 ||  || — || October 23, 2003 || Apache Point || SDSS Collaboration ||  || align=right | 2.1 km || 
|-id=777 bgcolor=#d6d6d6
| 618777 ||  || — || August 10, 2007 || Kitt Peak || Spacewatch ||  || align=right | 1.8 km || 
|-id=778 bgcolor=#d6d6d6
| 618778 ||  || — || October 22, 2003 || Kitt Peak || Spacewatch || 7:4 || align=right | 3.2 km || 
|-id=779 bgcolor=#d6d6d6
| 618779 ||  || — || August 14, 2012 || Siding Spring || SSS ||  || align=right | 2.1 km || 
|-id=780 bgcolor=#fefefe
| 618780 ||  || — || November 18, 2003 || Kitt Peak || Spacewatch ||  || align=right data-sort-value="0.75" | 750 m || 
|-id=781 bgcolor=#d6d6d6
| 618781 ||  || — || November 24, 2003 || Palomar || NEAT ||  || align=right | 2.3 km || 
|-id=782 bgcolor=#fefefe
| 618782 ||  || — || November 19, 2003 || Palomar || NEAT || H || align=right data-sort-value="0.68" | 680 m || 
|-id=783 bgcolor=#fefefe
| 618783 ||  || — || November 30, 2003 || Kitt Peak || Spacewatch ||  || align=right data-sort-value="0.55" | 550 m || 
|-id=784 bgcolor=#fefefe
| 618784 ||  || — || November 16, 1999 || Kitt Peak || Spacewatch ||  || align=right data-sort-value="0.66" | 660 m || 
|-id=785 bgcolor=#d6d6d6
| 618785 ||  || — || November 15, 1998 || Kitt Peak || Spacewatch ||  || align=right | 2.2 km || 
|-id=786 bgcolor=#C2FFFF
| 618786 ||  || — || August 26, 2012 || Haleakala || Pan-STARRS || Tj (2.98) || align=right | 6.4 km || 
|-id=787 bgcolor=#d6d6d6
| 618787 ||  || — || February 27, 2015 || Haleakala || Pan-STARRS ||  || align=right | 1.7 km || 
|-id=788 bgcolor=#d6d6d6
| 618788 ||  || — || March 24, 2015 || Mount Lemmon || Mount Lemmon Survey ||  || align=right | 2.1 km || 
|-id=789 bgcolor=#d6d6d6
| 618789 ||  || — || May 1, 2016 || Haleakala || Pan-STARRS ||  || align=right | 1.6 km || 
|-id=790 bgcolor=#fefefe
| 618790 ||  || — || December 1, 2003 || Kitt Peak || Spacewatch ||  || align=right data-sort-value="0.67" | 670 m || 
|-id=791 bgcolor=#fefefe
| 618791 ||  || — || April 29, 2012 || Mount Lemmon || Mount Lemmon Survey ||  || align=right data-sort-value="0.71" | 710 m || 
|-id=792 bgcolor=#E9E9E9
| 618792 ||  || — || December 19, 2003 || Needville || W. G. Dillon ||  || align=right data-sort-value="0.87" | 870 m || 
|-id=793 bgcolor=#fefefe
| 618793 ||  || — || December 17, 2003 || Socorro || LINEAR ||  || align=right data-sort-value="0.94" | 940 m || 
|-id=794 bgcolor=#E9E9E9
| 618794 ||  || — || December 28, 2003 || Socorro || LINEAR ||  || align=right | 1.1 km || 
|-id=795 bgcolor=#E9E9E9
| 618795 ||  || — || December 17, 2003 || Socorro || LINEAR ||  || align=right | 1.3 km || 
|-id=796 bgcolor=#d6d6d6
| 618796 ||  || — || December 17, 2003 || Socorro || LINEAR ||  || align=right | 2.3 km || 
|-id=797 bgcolor=#fefefe
| 618797 ||  || — || December 28, 2003 || Kitt Peak || Spacewatch ||  || align=right data-sort-value="0.64" | 640 m || 
|-id=798 bgcolor=#d6d6d6
| 618798 ||  || — || January 1, 2009 || Mount Lemmon || Mount Lemmon Survey ||  || align=right | 2.2 km || 
|-id=799 bgcolor=#fefefe
| 618799 ||  || — || December 7, 2015 || Haleakala || Pan-STARRS ||  || align=right data-sort-value="0.74" | 740 m || 
|-id=800 bgcolor=#E9E9E9
| 618800 ||  || — || December 25, 2003 || Apache Point || SDSS Collaboration ||  || align=right data-sort-value="0.85" | 850 m || 
|}

618801–618900 

|-bgcolor=#E9E9E9
| 618801 ||  || — || January 15, 2004 || Kitt Peak || Spacewatch ||  || align=right data-sort-value="0.84" | 840 m || 
|-id=802 bgcolor=#d6d6d6
| 618802 ||  || — || January 16, 2004 || Palomar || NEAT ||  || align=right | 2.9 km || 
|-id=803 bgcolor=#d6d6d6
| 618803 ||  || — || January 28, 2004 || Kitt Peak || Spacewatch ||  || align=right | 2.4 km || 
|-id=804 bgcolor=#d6d6d6
| 618804 ||  || — || January 31, 2004 || Apache Point || SDSS Collaboration ||  || align=right | 2.9 km || 
|-id=805 bgcolor=#d6d6d6
| 618805 ||  || — || December 29, 2008 || Kitt Peak || Spacewatch ||  || align=right | 2.2 km || 
|-id=806 bgcolor=#fefefe
| 618806 ||  || — || January 30, 2004 || Kitt Peak || Spacewatch ||  || align=right data-sort-value="0.65" | 650 m || 
|-id=807 bgcolor=#fefefe
| 618807 ||  || — || April 26, 2008 || Kitt Peak || Spacewatch ||  || align=right data-sort-value="0.72" | 720 m || 
|-id=808 bgcolor=#d6d6d6
| 618808 ||  || — || November 27, 2013 || Haleakala || Pan-STARRS ||  || align=right | 2.0 km || 
|-id=809 bgcolor=#d6d6d6
| 618809 ||  || — || January 18, 2004 || Palomar || NEAT ||  || align=right | 3.0 km || 
|-id=810 bgcolor=#d6d6d6
| 618810 ||  || — || February 12, 2004 || Palomar || NEAT ||  || align=right | 2.9 km || 
|-id=811 bgcolor=#d6d6d6
| 618811 ||  || — || January 31, 2004 || Kitt Peak || Spacewatch ||  || align=right | 3.3 km || 
|-id=812 bgcolor=#d6d6d6
| 618812 ||  || — || February 11, 2004 || Kitt Peak || Spacewatch ||  || align=right | 2.1 km || 
|-id=813 bgcolor=#E9E9E9
| 618813 ||  || — || July 27, 2005 || Palomar || NEAT ||  || align=right | 1.1 km || 
|-id=814 bgcolor=#fefefe
| 618814 ||  || — || January 24, 2014 || Haleakala || Pan-STARRS ||  || align=right data-sort-value="0.66" | 660 m || 
|-id=815 bgcolor=#d6d6d6
| 618815 ||  || — || February 17, 2004 || Kitt Peak || Spacewatch ||  || align=right | 2.3 km || 
|-id=816 bgcolor=#fefefe
| 618816 ||  || — || February 25, 2004 || Socorro || LINEAR ||  || align=right data-sort-value="0.81" | 810 m || 
|-id=817 bgcolor=#E9E9E9
| 618817 ||  || — || February 26, 2004 || Socorro || LINEAR ||  || align=right data-sort-value="0.92" | 920 m || 
|-id=818 bgcolor=#fefefe
| 618818 ||  || — || January 10, 2007 || Mount Lemmon || Mount Lemmon Survey ||  || align=right data-sort-value="0.57" | 570 m || 
|-id=819 bgcolor=#E9E9E9
| 618819 ||  || — || January 16, 2008 || Kitt Peak || Spacewatch ||  || align=right data-sort-value="0.83" | 830 m || 
|-id=820 bgcolor=#E9E9E9
| 618820 ||  || — || February 9, 2016 || Mount Lemmon || Mount Lemmon Survey ||  || align=right | 1.0 km || 
|-id=821 bgcolor=#E9E9E9
| 618821 ||  || — || September 6, 2014 || Mount Lemmon || Mount Lemmon Survey ||  || align=right data-sort-value="0.84" | 840 m || 
|-id=822 bgcolor=#d6d6d6
| 618822 ||  || — || February 22, 2004 || Kitt Peak || Spacewatch ||  || align=right | 1.7 km || 
|-id=823 bgcolor=#fefefe
| 618823 ||  || — || February 23, 2004 || Socorro || LINEAR ||  || align=right data-sort-value="0.57" | 570 m || 
|-id=824 bgcolor=#E9E9E9
| 618824 ||  || — || March 15, 2004 || Kitt Peak || Spacewatch ||  || align=right data-sort-value="0.98" | 980 m || 
|-id=825 bgcolor=#d6d6d6
| 618825 ||  || — || March 15, 2004 || Kitt Peak || Spacewatch ||  || align=right | 3.7 km || 
|-id=826 bgcolor=#d6d6d6
| 618826 ||  || — || March 15, 2004 || Kitt Peak || Spacewatch ||  || align=right | 2.1 km || 
|-id=827 bgcolor=#fefefe
| 618827 ||  || — || March 15, 2004 || Socorro || LINEAR ||  || align=right | 1.0 km || 
|-id=828 bgcolor=#fefefe
| 618828 ||  || — || March 10, 2004 || Palomar || NEAT ||  || align=right data-sort-value="0.82" | 820 m || 
|-id=829 bgcolor=#E9E9E9
| 618829 ||  || — || March 15, 2004 || Kitt Peak || Spacewatch ||  || align=right | 1.5 km || 
|-id=830 bgcolor=#d6d6d6
| 618830 ||  || — || March 15, 2004 || Kitt Peak || Spacewatch ||  || align=right | 2.0 km || 
|-id=831 bgcolor=#d6d6d6
| 618831 ||  || — || March 15, 2004 || Kitt Peak || Spacewatch ||  || align=right | 2.1 km || 
|-id=832 bgcolor=#d6d6d6
| 618832 ||  || — || March 15, 2004 || Kitt Peak || Spacewatch ||  || align=right | 2.4 km || 
|-id=833 bgcolor=#fefefe
| 618833 ||  || — || March 15, 2004 || Kitt Peak || Spacewatch ||  || align=right data-sort-value="0.51" | 510 m || 
|-id=834 bgcolor=#d6d6d6
| 618834 ||  || — || January 24, 2014 || Haleakala || Pan-STARRS ||  || align=right | 1.9 km || 
|-id=835 bgcolor=#E9E9E9
| 618835 ||  || — || February 12, 2004 || Palomar || NEAT ||  || align=right | 1.8 km || 
|-id=836 bgcolor=#E9E9E9
| 618836 ||  || — || March 17, 2004 || Kitt Peak || Spacewatch ||  || align=right data-sort-value="0.64" | 640 m || 
|-id=837 bgcolor=#d6d6d6
| 618837 ||  || — || March 17, 2004 || Kitt Peak || Spacewatch ||  || align=right | 2.2 km || 
|-id=838 bgcolor=#fefefe
| 618838 ||  || — || February 26, 2004 || Kitt Peak || M. W. Buie, D. E. Trilling ||  || align=right data-sort-value="0.67" | 670 m || 
|-id=839 bgcolor=#fefefe
| 618839 ||  || — || March 21, 2004 || Kitt Peak || Spacewatch ||  || align=right data-sort-value="0.67" | 670 m || 
|-id=840 bgcolor=#d6d6d6
| 618840 ||  || — || March 15, 2004 || Kitt Peak || Spacewatch ||  || align=right | 2.2 km || 
|-id=841 bgcolor=#d6d6d6
| 618841 ||  || — || March 27, 2004 || Kitt Peak || Spacewatch ||  || align=right | 2.4 km || 
|-id=842 bgcolor=#fefefe
| 618842 ||  || — || March 27, 2004 || Socorro || LINEAR ||  || align=right data-sort-value="0.53" | 530 m || 
|-id=843 bgcolor=#d6d6d6
| 618843 ||  || — || March 17, 2004 || Kitt Peak || Spacewatch ||  || align=right | 2.5 km || 
|-id=844 bgcolor=#d6d6d6
| 618844 ||  || — || February 26, 2004 || Kitt Peak || M. W. Buie, D. E. Trilling ||  || align=right | 2.3 km || 
|-id=845 bgcolor=#E9E9E9
| 618845 ||  || — || March 18, 2004 || Kitt Peak || Spacewatch ||  || align=right | 1.1 km || 
|-id=846 bgcolor=#d6d6d6
| 618846 ||  || — || April 25, 2000 || Kitt Peak || Spacewatch ||  || align=right | 3.5 km || 
|-id=847 bgcolor=#E9E9E9
| 618847 ||  || — || March 30, 2004 || Kitt Peak || Spacewatch ||  || align=right | 1.5 km || 
|-id=848 bgcolor=#d6d6d6
| 618848 ||  || — || March 23, 2004 || Kitt Peak || Spacewatch ||  || align=right | 2.7 km || 
|-id=849 bgcolor=#E9E9E9
| 618849 ||  || — || April 26, 2000 || Kitt Peak || Spacewatch ||  || align=right | 1.1 km || 
|-id=850 bgcolor=#E9E9E9
| 618850 ||  || — || February 23, 2012 || Mount Lemmon || Mount Lemmon Survey ||  || align=right | 1.4 km || 
|-id=851 bgcolor=#d6d6d6
| 618851 ||  || — || February 13, 2004 || Kitt Peak || Spacewatch ||  || align=right | 2.5 km || 
|-id=852 bgcolor=#E9E9E9
| 618852 ||  || — || June 3, 2000 || Kitt Peak || Spacewatch ||  || align=right | 1.6 km || 
|-id=853 bgcolor=#fefefe
| 618853 ||  || — || March 26, 2004 || Kitt Peak || Spacewatch ||  || align=right data-sort-value="0.43" | 430 m || 
|-id=854 bgcolor=#E9E9E9
| 618854 ||  || — || April 12, 2004 || Kitt Peak || Spacewatch ||  || align=right | 1.7 km || 
|-id=855 bgcolor=#d6d6d6
| 618855 ||  || — || February 21, 2009 || Kitt Peak || Spacewatch ||  || align=right | 2.4 km || 
|-id=856 bgcolor=#fefefe
| 618856 ||  || — || March 16, 2004 || Kitt Peak || Spacewatch ||  || align=right data-sort-value="0.63" | 630 m || 
|-id=857 bgcolor=#d6d6d6
| 618857 ||  || — || March 13, 2004 || Palomar || NEAT ||  || align=right | 2.4 km || 
|-id=858 bgcolor=#E9E9E9
| 618858 ||  || — || November 1, 2006 || Mount Lemmon || Mount Lemmon Survey ||  || align=right | 1.7 km || 
|-id=859 bgcolor=#E9E9E9
| 618859 ||  || — || December 28, 2011 || Mount Lemmon || Mount Lemmon Survey ||  || align=right | 1.5 km || 
|-id=860 bgcolor=#d6d6d6
| 618860 ||  || — || March 1, 2009 || Mount Lemmon || Mount Lemmon Survey ||  || align=right | 2.9 km || 
|-id=861 bgcolor=#d6d6d6
| 618861 ||  || — || October 20, 2006 || Kitt Peak || Spacewatch ||  || align=right | 2.4 km || 
|-id=862 bgcolor=#E9E9E9
| 618862 ||  || — || March 30, 2004 || Kitt Peak || Spacewatch ||  || align=right | 1.3 km || 
|-id=863 bgcolor=#E9E9E9
| 618863 ||  || — || March 26, 2004 || Socorro || LINEAR ||  || align=right | 1.7 km || 
|-id=864 bgcolor=#E9E9E9
| 618864 ||  || — || April 27, 2004 || Socorro || LINEAR ||  || align=right | 1.1 km || 
|-id=865 bgcolor=#E9E9E9
| 618865 ||  || — || April 29, 2004 || Haleakala || AMOS ||  || align=right | 1.8 km || 
|-id=866 bgcolor=#d6d6d6
| 618866 ||  || — || April 24, 2004 || Kitt Peak || Spacewatch ||  || align=right | 2.5 km || 
|-id=867 bgcolor=#fefefe
| 618867 ||  || — || April 16, 2004 || Apache Point || SDSS Collaboration ||  || align=right data-sort-value="0.96" | 960 m || 
|-id=868 bgcolor=#d6d6d6
| 618868 ||  || — || October 16, 2012 || Mount Lemmon || Mount Lemmon Survey ||  || align=right | 2.4 km || 
|-id=869 bgcolor=#E9E9E9
| 618869 ||  || — || April 28, 2004 || Kitt Peak || Spacewatch ||  || align=right | 1.1 km || 
|-id=870 bgcolor=#fefefe
| 618870 ||  || — || April 23, 2004 || Desert Eagle || W. K. Y. Yeung ||  || align=right data-sort-value="0.61" | 610 m || 
|-id=871 bgcolor=#fefefe
| 618871 ||  || — || April 20, 2004 || Kitt Peak || Spacewatch ||  || align=right data-sort-value="0.69" | 690 m || 
|-id=872 bgcolor=#d6d6d6
| 618872 ||  || — || September 25, 2006 || Kitt Peak || Spacewatch ||  || align=right | 3.0 km || 
|-id=873 bgcolor=#d6d6d6
| 618873 ||  || — || April 22, 2004 || Apache Point || SDSS Collaboration ||  || align=right | 2.7 km || 
|-id=874 bgcolor=#E9E9E9
| 618874 ||  || — || April 20, 2004 || Kitt Peak || Spacewatch ||  || align=right | 1.4 km || 
|-id=875 bgcolor=#d6d6d6
| 618875 ||  || — || February 16, 2015 || Haleakala || Pan-STARRS ||  || align=right | 1.9 km || 
|-id=876 bgcolor=#d6d6d6
| 618876 ||  || — || April 28, 2004 || Kitt Peak || Spacewatch ||  || align=right | 2.4 km || 
|-id=877 bgcolor=#d6d6d6
| 618877 ||  || — || May 13, 2004 || Kitt Peak || Spacewatch ||  || align=right | 2.9 km || 
|-id=878 bgcolor=#d6d6d6
| 618878 ||  || — || May 13, 2004 || Kitt Peak || Spacewatch ||  || align=right | 3.3 km || 
|-id=879 bgcolor=#E9E9E9
| 618879 ||  || — || May 15, 2004 || Socorro || LINEAR ||  || align=right | 2.2 km || 
|-id=880 bgcolor=#fefefe
| 618880 ||  || — || April 21, 2004 || Kitt Peak || Spacewatch ||  || align=right data-sort-value="0.48" | 480 m || 
|-id=881 bgcolor=#E9E9E9
| 618881 ||  || — || May 9, 2004 || Kitt Peak || Spacewatch ||  || align=right | 2.0 km || 
|-id=882 bgcolor=#d6d6d6
| 618882 ||  || — || April 2, 2009 || Mount Lemmon || Mount Lemmon Survey ||  || align=right | 2.6 km || 
|-id=883 bgcolor=#fefefe
| 618883 ||  || — || February 20, 2014 || Mount Lemmon || Mount Lemmon Survey ||  || align=right data-sort-value="0.76" | 760 m || 
|-id=884 bgcolor=#d6d6d6
| 618884 ||  || — || October 28, 2006 || Kitt Peak || Spacewatch ||  || align=right | 2.9 km || 
|-id=885 bgcolor=#d6d6d6
| 618885 ||  || — || April 25, 2004 || Kitt Peak || Spacewatch ||  || align=right | 2.0 km || 
|-id=886 bgcolor=#E9E9E9
| 618886 ||  || — || May 16, 2004 || Socorro || LINEAR ||  || align=right | 1.6 km || 
|-id=887 bgcolor=#d6d6d6
| 618887 ||  || — || October 20, 2012 || Haleakala || Pan-STARRS ||  || align=right | 3.4 km || 
|-id=888 bgcolor=#d6d6d6
| 618888 ||  || — || July 5, 2016 || Haleakala || Pan-STARRS ||  || align=right | 3.1 km || 
|-id=889 bgcolor=#d6d6d6
| 618889 ||  || — || June 8, 2016 || Haleakala || Pan-STARRS || Tj (2.99) || align=right | 3.0 km || 
|-id=890 bgcolor=#E9E9E9
| 618890 ||  || — || July 15, 2013 || Haleakala || Pan-STARRS ||  || align=right | 1.1 km || 
|-id=891 bgcolor=#FA8072
| 618891 ||  || — || June 27, 2004 || Catalina || CSS ||  || align=right | 2.1 km || 
|-id=892 bgcolor=#E9E9E9
| 618892 ||  || — || June 27, 2004 || Kitt Peak || Spacewatch ||  || align=right | 1.8 km || 
|-id=893 bgcolor=#d6d6d6
| 618893 ||  || — || January 28, 2014 || Catalina || CSS ||  || align=right | 2.9 km || 
|-id=894 bgcolor=#E9E9E9
| 618894 ||  || — || January 13, 2016 || Haleakala || Pan-STARRS ||  || align=right | 1.4 km || 
|-id=895 bgcolor=#E9E9E9
| 618895 ||  || — || August 8, 2004 || Palomar || NEAT ||  || align=right | 1.5 km || 
|-id=896 bgcolor=#fefefe
| 618896 ||  || — || August 7, 2004 || Palomar || NEAT ||  || align=right data-sort-value="0.83" | 830 m || 
|-id=897 bgcolor=#fefefe
| 618897 ||  || — || August 8, 2004 || Palomar || NEAT ||  || align=right data-sort-value="0.80" | 800 m || 
|-id=898 bgcolor=#E9E9E9
| 618898 ||  || — || October 24, 2005 || Kitt Peak || Spacewatch ||  || align=right | 1.1 km || 
|-id=899 bgcolor=#FA8072
| 618899 ||  || — || August 21, 2004 || Siding Spring || SSS ||  || align=right data-sort-value="0.55" | 550 m || 
|-id=900 bgcolor=#fefefe
| 618900 ||  || — || September 7, 2008 || Mount Lemmon || Mount Lemmon Survey ||  || align=right data-sort-value="0.61" | 610 m || 
|}

618901–619000 

|-bgcolor=#E9E9E9
| 618901 ||  || — || August 22, 2004 || Kitt Peak || Spacewatch ||  || align=right | 1.2 km || 
|-id=902 bgcolor=#fefefe
| 618902 ||  || — || August 25, 2004 || Kitt Peak || Spacewatch ||  || align=right data-sort-value="0.60" | 600 m || 
|-id=903 bgcolor=#fefefe
| 618903 ||  || — || August 11, 2004 || Palomar || NEAT ||  || align=right data-sort-value="0.92" | 920 m || 
|-id=904 bgcolor=#E9E9E9
| 618904 ||  || — || September 6, 2004 || Palomar || NEAT ||  || align=right | 2.6 km || 
|-id=905 bgcolor=#FA8072
| 618905 ||  || — || September 10, 2004 || Socorro || LINEAR ||  || align=right data-sort-value="0.82" | 820 m || 
|-id=906 bgcolor=#fefefe
| 618906 ||  || — || September 7, 2004 || Palomar || NEAT ||  || align=right | 1.0 km || 
|-id=907 bgcolor=#E9E9E9
| 618907 ||  || — || September 7, 2004 || Palomar || NEAT ||  || align=right | 2.3 km || 
|-id=908 bgcolor=#fefefe
| 618908 ||  || — || September 7, 2004 || Kitt Peak || Spacewatch ||  || align=right data-sort-value="0.69" | 690 m || 
|-id=909 bgcolor=#E9E9E9
| 618909 ||  || — || August 15, 2004 || Cerro Tololo || Cerro Tololo Obs. ||  || align=right | 2.0 km || 
|-id=910 bgcolor=#E9E9E9
| 618910 ||  || — || September 8, 2004 || Socorro || LINEAR ||  || align=right | 1.4 km || 
|-id=911 bgcolor=#fefefe
| 618911 ||  || — || September 10, 2004 || Kitt Peak || Spacewatch || H || align=right data-sort-value="0.35" | 350 m || 
|-id=912 bgcolor=#E9E9E9
| 618912 ||  || — || August 13, 2004 || Cerro Tololo || Cerro Tololo Obs. ||  || align=right | 1.4 km || 
|-id=913 bgcolor=#fefefe
| 618913 ||  || — || September 10, 2004 || Kitt Peak || Spacewatch ||  || align=right data-sort-value="0.72" | 720 m || 
|-id=914 bgcolor=#fefefe
| 618914 ||  || — || August 13, 2004 || Cerro Tololo || Cerro Tololo Obs. || H || align=right data-sort-value="0.55" | 550 m || 
|-id=915 bgcolor=#E9E9E9
| 618915 ||  || — || September 10, 2004 || Kitt Peak || Spacewatch ||  || align=right | 1.5 km || 
|-id=916 bgcolor=#fefefe
| 618916 ||  || — || September 10, 2004 || Kitt Peak || Spacewatch ||  || align=right data-sort-value="0.54" | 540 m || 
|-id=917 bgcolor=#E9E9E9
| 618917 ||  || — || September 15, 2004 || Kitt Peak || Spacewatch ||  || align=right | 1.6 km || 
|-id=918 bgcolor=#E9E9E9
| 618918 ||  || — || September 7, 2004 || Palomar || NEAT ||  || align=right | 2.3 km || 
|-id=919 bgcolor=#fefefe
| 618919 ||  || — || September 12, 2004 || Mauna Kea || Mauna Kea Obs. ||  || align=right data-sort-value="0.71" | 710 m || 
|-id=920 bgcolor=#fefefe
| 618920 ||  || — || October 28, 2008 || Kitt Peak || Spacewatch ||  || align=right data-sort-value="0.50" | 500 m || 
|-id=921 bgcolor=#fefefe
| 618921 ||  || — || September 14, 2004 || Palomar || NEAT ||  || align=right | 1.4 km || 
|-id=922 bgcolor=#fefefe
| 618922 ||  || — || September 13, 2004 || Socorro || LINEAR ||  || align=right data-sort-value="0.60" | 600 m || 
|-id=923 bgcolor=#E9E9E9
| 618923 ||  || — || August 13, 2013 || Kitt Peak || Spacewatch ||  || align=right | 1.6 km || 
|-id=924 bgcolor=#fefefe
| 618924 ||  || — || September 17, 2004 || Kitt Peak || Spacewatch ||  || align=right data-sort-value="0.69" | 690 m || 
|-id=925 bgcolor=#fefefe
| 618925 ||  || — || October 4, 2004 || Kitt Peak || Spacewatch ||  || align=right data-sort-value="0.53" | 530 m || 
|-id=926 bgcolor=#E9E9E9
| 618926 ||  || — || October 5, 2004 || Goodricke-Pigott || R. A. Tucker ||  || align=right | 2.3 km || 
|-id=927 bgcolor=#E9E9E9
| 618927 ||  || — || October 5, 2004 || Kitt Peak || Spacewatch ||  || align=right | 1.3 km || 
|-id=928 bgcolor=#E9E9E9
| 618928 ||  || — || October 5, 2004 || Kitt Peak || Spacewatch ||  || align=right | 2.1 km || 
|-id=929 bgcolor=#fefefe
| 618929 ||  || — || October 5, 2004 || Kitt Peak || Spacewatch ||  || align=right data-sort-value="0.57" | 570 m || 
|-id=930 bgcolor=#E9E9E9
| 618930 ||  || — || October 5, 2004 || Kitt Peak || Spacewatch ||  || align=right | 1.7 km || 
|-id=931 bgcolor=#E9E9E9
| 618931 ||  || — || October 6, 2004 || Kitt Peak || Spacewatch ||  || align=right | 1.9 km || 
|-id=932 bgcolor=#fefefe
| 618932 ||  || — || October 7, 2004 || Kitt Peak || Spacewatch ||  || align=right data-sort-value="0.79" | 790 m || 
|-id=933 bgcolor=#fefefe
| 618933 ||  || — || October 7, 2004 || Kitt Peak || Spacewatch ||  || align=right data-sort-value="0.64" | 640 m || 
|-id=934 bgcolor=#fefefe
| 618934 ||  || — || September 24, 2004 || Kitt Peak || Spacewatch ||  || align=right data-sort-value="0.60" | 600 m || 
|-id=935 bgcolor=#fefefe
| 618935 ||  || — || October 7, 2004 || Kitt Peak || Spacewatch || H || align=right data-sort-value="0.40" | 400 m || 
|-id=936 bgcolor=#fefefe
| 618936 ||  || — || October 7, 2004 || Kitt Peak || Spacewatch ||  || align=right data-sort-value="0.76" | 760 m || 
|-id=937 bgcolor=#E9E9E9
| 618937 ||  || — || October 8, 2004 || Kitt Peak || Spacewatch ||  || align=right | 1.8 km || 
|-id=938 bgcolor=#E9E9E9
| 618938 ||  || — || October 28, 1995 || Kitt Peak || Spacewatch ||  || align=right | 1.7 km || 
|-id=939 bgcolor=#E9E9E9
| 618939 ||  || — || October 8, 2004 || Kitt Peak || Spacewatch ||  || align=right | 1.7 km || 
|-id=940 bgcolor=#fefefe
| 618940 ||  || — || October 11, 2004 || Kitt Peak || Spacewatch ||  || align=right data-sort-value="0.89" | 890 m || 
|-id=941 bgcolor=#E9E9E9
| 618941 ||  || — || October 13, 2004 || Kitt Peak || Spacewatch ||  || align=right | 1.8 km || 
|-id=942 bgcolor=#fefefe
| 618942 ||  || — || October 14, 2004 || Palomar || NEAT ||  || align=right data-sort-value="0.72" | 720 m || 
|-id=943 bgcolor=#fefefe
| 618943 ||  || — || October 7, 2004 || Kitt Peak || Spacewatch || H || align=right data-sort-value="0.58" | 580 m || 
|-id=944 bgcolor=#fefefe
| 618944 ||  || — || July 28, 2011 || Haleakala || Pan-STARRS ||  || align=right data-sort-value="0.64" | 640 m || 
|-id=945 bgcolor=#fefefe
| 618945 ||  || — || October 5, 2004 || Kitt Peak || Spacewatch ||  || align=right data-sort-value="0.49" | 490 m || 
|-id=946 bgcolor=#fefefe
| 618946 ||  || — || October 9, 2004 || Kitt Peak || Spacewatch ||  || align=right data-sort-value="0.63" | 630 m || 
|-id=947 bgcolor=#E9E9E9
| 618947 ||  || — || October 3, 2013 || Haleakala || Pan-STARRS ||  || align=right | 2.1 km || 
|-id=948 bgcolor=#fefefe
| 618948 ||  || — || November 1, 2015 || Haleakala || Pan-STARRS ||  || align=right data-sort-value="0.80" | 800 m || 
|-id=949 bgcolor=#E9E9E9
| 618949 ||  || — || December 10, 2009 || Mount Lemmon || Mount Lemmon Survey ||  || align=right | 2.0 km || 
|-id=950 bgcolor=#d6d6d6
| 618950 ||  || — || August 2, 2016 || Haleakala || Pan-STARRS || 7:4 || align=right | 2.7 km || 
|-id=951 bgcolor=#fefefe
| 618951 ||  || — || September 18, 2015 || Kitt Peak || Spacewatch ||  || align=right data-sort-value="0.64" | 640 m || 
|-id=952 bgcolor=#E9E9E9
| 618952 ||  || — || September 7, 2008 || Mount Lemmon || Mount Lemmon Survey ||  || align=right | 1.6 km || 
|-id=953 bgcolor=#E9E9E9
| 618953 ||  || — || August 28, 2013 || Haleakala || Pan-STARRS ||  || align=right | 2.1 km || 
|-id=954 bgcolor=#fefefe
| 618954 ||  || — || October 7, 2004 || Kitt Peak || Spacewatch ||  || align=right data-sort-value="0.46" | 460 m || 
|-id=955 bgcolor=#E9E9E9
| 618955 ||  || — || October 4, 2004 || Kitt Peak || Spacewatch ||  || align=right | 1.8 km || 
|-id=956 bgcolor=#fefefe
| 618956 ||  || — || November 3, 2004 || Kitt Peak || Spacewatch ||  || align=right data-sort-value="0.63" | 630 m || 
|-id=957 bgcolor=#fefefe
| 618957 ||  || — || October 14, 2004 || Kitt Peak || Spacewatch ||  || align=right data-sort-value="0.98" | 980 m || 
|-id=958 bgcolor=#E9E9E9
| 618958 ||  || — || October 15, 2004 || Mount Lemmon || Mount Lemmon Survey ||  || align=right | 1.9 km || 
|-id=959 bgcolor=#E9E9E9
| 618959 ||  || — || November 11, 2004 || Kitt Peak || Spacewatch ||  || align=right | 1.8 km || 
|-id=960 bgcolor=#fefefe
| 618960 ||  || — || November 10, 2004 || Kitt Peak || Spacewatch ||  || align=right data-sort-value="0.63" | 630 m || 
|-id=961 bgcolor=#E9E9E9
| 618961 ||  || — || November 9, 2004 || Mauna Kea || Mauna Kea Obs. ||  || align=right | 1.9 km || 
|-id=962 bgcolor=#fefefe
| 618962 ||  || — || October 18, 2004 || Kitt Peak || M. W. Buie, D. E. Trilling ||  || align=right data-sort-value="0.69" | 690 m || 
|-id=963 bgcolor=#fefefe
| 618963 ||  || — || November 4, 2004 || Kitt Peak || Spacewatch ||  || align=right data-sort-value="0.67" | 670 m || 
|-id=964 bgcolor=#fefefe
| 618964 ||  || — || October 19, 2011 || Haleakala || Pan-STARRS ||  || align=right | 1.1 km || 
|-id=965 bgcolor=#E9E9E9
| 618965 ||  || — || October 3, 2013 || Mount Lemmon || Mount Lemmon Survey ||  || align=right | 1.9 km || 
|-id=966 bgcolor=#E9E9E9
| 618966 ||  || — || November 9, 2004 || Catalina || CSS ||  || align=right | 1.6 km || 
|-id=967 bgcolor=#E9E9E9
| 618967 ||  || — || July 24, 2017 || Haleakala || Pan-STARRS ||  || align=right | 1.6 km || 
|-id=968 bgcolor=#fefefe
| 618968 ||  || — || December 22, 2008 || Mount Lemmon || Mount Lemmon Survey ||  || align=right data-sort-value="0.51" | 510 m || 
|-id=969 bgcolor=#E9E9E9
| 618969 ||  || — || March 29, 2011 || Mount Lemmon || Mount Lemmon Survey ||  || align=right | 1.7 km || 
|-id=970 bgcolor=#E9E9E9
| 618970 ||  || — || September 1, 2013 || Piszkesteto || K. Sárneczky ||  || align=right | 1.9 km || 
|-id=971 bgcolor=#fefefe
| 618971 ||  || — || November 17, 2004 || Campo Imperatore || CINEOS ||  || align=right data-sort-value="0.56" | 560 m || 
|-id=972 bgcolor=#E9E9E9
| 618972 ||  || — || September 9, 2008 || Mount Lemmon || Mount Lemmon Survey ||  || align=right | 1.9 km || 
|-id=973 bgcolor=#E9E9E9
| 618973 ||  || — || December 10, 2004 || Socorro || LINEAR ||  || align=right | 2.4 km || 
|-id=974 bgcolor=#E9E9E9
| 618974 ||  || — || December 11, 2004 || Campo Imperatore || CINEOS ||  || align=right | 2.2 km || 
|-id=975 bgcolor=#fefefe
| 618975 ||  || — || December 10, 2004 || Kitt Peak || Spacewatch ||  || align=right data-sort-value="0.53" | 530 m || 
|-id=976 bgcolor=#d6d6d6
| 618976 ||  || — || December 11, 2004 || Kitt Peak || Spacewatch ||  || align=right | 1.9 km || 
|-id=977 bgcolor=#fefefe
| 618977 ||  || — || December 12, 2004 || Kitt Peak || Spacewatch ||  || align=right data-sort-value="0.64" | 640 m || 
|-id=978 bgcolor=#fefefe
| 618978 ||  || — || September 7, 2000 || Kitt Peak || Spacewatch ||  || align=right data-sort-value="0.60" | 600 m || 
|-id=979 bgcolor=#fefefe
| 618979 ||  || — || December 14, 2004 || Kitt Peak || Spacewatch ||  || align=right data-sort-value="0.84" | 840 m || 
|-id=980 bgcolor=#fefefe
| 618980 ||  || — || October 8, 2004 || Palomar || NEAT ||  || align=right data-sort-value="0.99" | 990 m || 
|-id=981 bgcolor=#fefefe
| 618981 ||  || — || December 10, 2004 || Kitt Peak || Spacewatch ||  || align=right data-sort-value="0.75" | 750 m || 
|-id=982 bgcolor=#fefefe
| 618982 ||  || — || February 3, 2009 || Kitt Peak || Spacewatch ||  || align=right data-sort-value="0.68" | 680 m || 
|-id=983 bgcolor=#E9E9E9
| 618983 ||  || — || October 23, 2013 || Haleakala || Pan-STARRS ||  || align=right | 1.8 km || 
|-id=984 bgcolor=#E9E9E9
| 618984 ||  || — || December 17, 2004 || Socorro || LINEAR ||  || align=right | 2.7 km || 
|-id=985 bgcolor=#d6d6d6
| 618985 ||  || — || January 24, 2015 || Haleakala || Pan-STARRS ||  || align=right | 1.9 km || 
|-id=986 bgcolor=#C2FFFF
| 618986 ||  || — || January 15, 2005 || Kitt Peak || Spacewatch || Tj (2.95) || align=right | 7.9 km || 
|-id=987 bgcolor=#fefefe
| 618987 ||  || — || November 16, 2011 || Catalina || CSS ||  || align=right data-sort-value="0.89" | 890 m || 
|-id=988 bgcolor=#C2FFFF
| 618988 ||  || — || January 16, 2005 || Mauna Kea || Mauna Kea Obs. || Tj (2.99) || align=right | 5.6 km || 
|-id=989 bgcolor=#d6d6d6
| 618989 ||  || — || January 16, 2005 || Mauna Kea || Mauna Kea Obs. ||  || align=right | 1.6 km || 
|-id=990 bgcolor=#fefefe
| 618990 ||  || — || January 16, 2005 || Mauna Kea || Mauna Kea Obs. ||  || align=right data-sort-value="0.59" | 590 m || 
|-id=991 bgcolor=#d6d6d6
| 618991 ||  || — || June 23, 2017 || Haleakala || Pan-STARRS ||  || align=right | 2.1 km || 
|-id=992 bgcolor=#fefefe
| 618992 ||  || — || January 16, 2005 || Kitt Peak || Spacewatch ||  || align=right data-sort-value="0.59" | 590 m || 
|-id=993 bgcolor=#fefefe
| 618993 ||  || — || January 16, 2005 || Kitt Peak || Spacewatch ||  || align=right data-sort-value="0.81" | 810 m || 
|-id=994 bgcolor=#d6d6d6
| 618994 ||  || — || February 2, 2005 || Kitt Peak || Spacewatch ||  || align=right | 1.5 km || 
|-id=995 bgcolor=#d6d6d6
| 618995 ||  || — || February 2, 2005 || Kitt Peak || Spacewatch ||  || align=right | 2.2 km || 
|-id=996 bgcolor=#fefefe
| 618996 ||  || — || January 23, 2015 || Haleakala || Pan-STARRS ||  || align=right data-sort-value="0.62" | 620 m || 
|-id=997 bgcolor=#E9E9E9
| 618997 ||  || — || February 9, 2005 || Mount Lemmon || Mount Lemmon Survey ||  || align=right data-sort-value="0.87" | 870 m || 
|-id=998 bgcolor=#fefefe
| 618998 ||  || — || October 4, 2007 || Mount Lemmon || Mount Lemmon Survey ||  || align=right data-sort-value="0.71" | 710 m || 
|-id=999 bgcolor=#fefefe
| 618999 ||  || — || March 3, 2005 || Kitt Peak || Spacewatch ||  || align=right data-sort-value="0.75" | 750 m || 
|-id=000 bgcolor=#fefefe
| 619000 ||  || — || March 1, 2005 || Kitt Peak || Spacewatch ||  || align=right data-sort-value="0.52" | 520 m || 
|}

References

External links 
 Discovery Circumstances: Numbered Minor Planets (615001)–(620000) (IAU Minor Planet Center)

0618